= Nobuo Mii =

Nobuo Mii (Japanese: 三井 信雄=Mii Nobuo; July 4, 1931 – July 14, 2015), often called Nobi by English speakers, was a Japanese computer pioneer who made various contributions, working for NHK and IBM, and also is an investment fund executive.

== Early life and education ==
Nobuo Mii was born in Fukuoka Prefecture, Japan, on July 4, 1931. He studied at Fukuoka Prefectural Shuyukan Senior High School and Kyushu University, graduating from the latter in 1955.

In senior high school, he was the manager of Wireless Communications Club. In 1949, he successfully lead the club members to make a television system for the first time in Kyushu, mainly using the electronic parts thrown away by the U.S. Armed Forces stationed in Fukuoka City, ahead of Kyushu University's Engineering School or NHK's Fukuoka Broadcasting Station. His television was displayed at Western Japan Invention Exhibition and won the Invention Award from the Ministry of Education.

== Career ==
=== In NHK ===
Upon graduation from university, he started to work at NHK Science & Technology Research Laboratories, Japan Broadcasting Corporation. Half a year later, he was sent by NHK to Columbia University to study transistor technology, and, upon return to Japan, made contribution to the application of transistors in broadcasting.

From 1961, he worked in a team in NHK to automate their program preparation and broadcasting. This team eventually implemented the Total Online Program and Information Control System (TOPICS), using IBM System/360 and IBM 1800 computers. TOPICS was developed in close relationship with IBM's Federal Systems Division.

=== In IBM ===
During NHK's TOPICS project, Nobuo Mii impressed Bob Evans, who had led the IBM System/360 project to success and was the head of Federal Systems Division at that time, and was invited to work for IBM. He was hired by IBM Japan, Ltd., in 1969, but was immediately sent to IBM in U.S. and worked on Apollo Project.

In 1971, as IBM created IBM Japan Development Laboratory, Nobuo Mii became its Technical Operations director, working in Research Triangle Park, North Carolina, and lead the project to develop IBM 3767 printer terminal, using the new Systems Network Architecture communications protocol.

In 1973, he became Director of the renamed IBM Fujisawa Development Laboratory and lead various projects for the Japanese and worldwide markets, which included: IBM Japanese Language Processing System, the "Gemstone" low cost communications terminal series (IBM 3101 ASCII, 3104, 3178/3179 display terminals), etc. He was also involved in the development of IBM 5550 and IBM JX, which eventually led his Laboratory to develop IBM ThinkPad.

In 1990, Nobuo Mii was named an IBM Corporate Vice President. He was later named a Director in Entry Systems Division and Power Personal Division. He was also a KALEIDA board member from December 1991.

In 1993, he became President of Power Personal Systems Company, whose objective was to develop, manufacture and promote PowerPC microprocessor. He retired from IBM in 1995.

=== In an investment fund ===
After retirement from IBM, he became the head of Sega's software company in U.S. In 1997 he created Ignite Group in Silicon Valley, and set up Ignite Japan in 2000, becoming its chairman.

== See also ==
- NHK & NHK Science & Technology Research Laboratories
- IBM System/360, IBM 1800 & Bob O. Evans
- IBM Kanji System, Systems Network Architecture, IBM 3767, IBM 3101, IBM 5550, IBM JX & ThinkPad
