= IBM Advanced Peer-to-Peer Networking =

IBM Advanced Peer-to-Peer Networking (APPN) is an extension to the Systems Network Architecture (SNA) "that allows large and small computers to communicate as peers across local and wide-area networks."

== Goals and features ==
The goals of APPN were:

- Provide effective routing for SNA traffic
- Allow sessions to be established without the involvement of a central computer
- Reduce the requirements to predict resource use
- Provide prioritization within SNA traffic
- Support both legacy and APPN traffic

To meet these goals it includes features such as these:

- distributed network control
- dynamic exchange of network topology information to foster ease of connection, reconfiguration, and route selection
- dynamic definition of network resources
- automated resource registration and directory lookup.

== History ==
APPN was defined around 1986, and was meant to complement IBM's Systems Network Architecture. It was designed as a simplification, but it turned out to be significantly complex, in particular in migration situations. APPN was originally meant to be a "DECNET killer", but DEC actually died before APPN was completed. APPN has been largely superseded by TCP/IP (Internet).

APPN evolved to include a more efficient data routing layer which was called High Performance Routing (HPR). HPR was made available across a range of enterprise corporation networking products in the late 1990s, but today is typically used only within IBM's z/OS environments as a replacement for legacy SNA networks. It seems to be still widely used within UDP tunnels, this technology is known as Enterprise Extender.

APPN should not be confused with the similarly named APPC (Advanced Program-to-Program Communication). APPN manages communication between machines, including routing, and operates at the transport and network layers. By contrast, APPC manages communication between programs, operating at the application and presentation layers.

APPN has nothing to do with peer-to-peer file sharing software such as Bittorrent or emule. The designation peer-to-peer in the case of APPN refers to its independence from a central point of control, similar to the way that a FireWire PC connection allows a video camera to talk directly to a disk drive on the FireWire network.

== Components ==
An APPN network can be composed of up to five types of nodes:

Network Node (NN)	APPN router
End Node (EN)	application host
Low Entry Node (LEN)	original peer node that "allowed communication between two nodes with the intervention of VTAM."
Composite Network Node (CNN)	VTAM/NCP node
Branch Network Node (BrNN)	"appears as an EN to an upstream NN while it provides NN services for downstream ENs and LENs."

In VTAM, APPN nodes are defined as PU 2.1.

== Device support ==
APPN is supported on a variety of IBM and non-IBM "intelligent" devices and software. It is available on mainframes, AS/400, System/36, OS/2 via Communications Server, Cisco equipment, and Microsoft Host Integration Services (HIS) for Windows.
