= Microsoft Host Integration Server =

Gateway application providing connectivity between Microsoft Windows and IBM mainframe

- Developer: Microsoft
- Release: 1994; 32 years ago (as SNA Server)
- Stable release: 2020 / June 1, 2020; 6 years ago
- Operating system: Windows Server, Windows
- Type: Gateway application
- License: Proprietary commercial software

Microsoft Host Integration Server (a.k.a. HIS) is a gateway application providing connectivity between Microsoft Windows networks and IBM mainframe and IBM i systems. Support is provided for SNA, 3270 (standard and TN3270), 5250 (standard and TN5250), CICS, APPC, and other IBM protocols. Support is also provided for advanced integration with Windows networks and software, such as linking Microsoft Message Queuing applications to IBM WebSphere MQ, binding Microsoft DTC transactions with CICS, and cross-protocol access to Db2 databases on IBM platforms.

HIS is the successor to Microsoft SNA Server. SNA Server was released in 1994, and was one of the first add-on products available for the fledgling Windows NT. SNA Server was also included in Microsoft BackOffice Server.

Similar gateway products were NetWare for SAA (defunct, ran on Novell NetWare) and IBM Communications Manager/2 (defunct, ran on OS/2).

HIS has an active ecosystem of third-party hardware (e.g. network adapters supporting ESCON and Twinax connectivity) and software.

== History ==
=== SNA Server 1.0 ===
Initial version of SNA Server was released in 1994.

=== SNA Server 2.x ===
SNA Server 2.1 was introduced in September 1994, and included in BackOffice 1.0.

SNA Server 2.11 was released in July 1995, added new features such as Windows NT 3.51 support. Version 2.11 was included in BackOffice 1.5/2.0. Version 2.11 SP1 was released on January 31, 1996, which included new features such as Distributed Gateway Service, support for TN3270E clients, and FTP-AFTP gateway.

=== SNA Server 3.0 ===
SNA Server 3.0 was released on December 17, 1996. SNA Server 3.0 nearly doubled the capacity up to 5,000 users and up to 15,000 host sessions. Other major new features include SNA print service, single sign-on to AS/400s and mainframes, TN5250 service, support for TN3287 clients in TN3270E service. Version 3.0 was included in BackOffice 2.5.

Service Pack was released up to SP4, which was released on November 1, 1996.

=== SNA Server 4.0 ===
SNA Server 4.0 was generally available in January 1998, included in BackOffice Server 4.0/4.5. SNA Server enhanced its features to support more clients and protocols, including Windows NT, Windows 95, Windows for Workgroups, Windows 3.x, DOS, and OS/2, with protocols of TCP/IP, IPX/SPX, Banyan VINES, AppleTalk, and Microsoft Named Pipes. Third-party solutions provide Macintosh and UNIX support. SNA Server 4.0 also included a new COM based integration technology called COM Transaction Integrator (COMTI, code-named Cedar), which enables easier integration using GUI and Web page. Snap-ins for Microsoft Management Console (MMC) were introduced to easily manage SNA Server, COMTI, and OLE DB Provider in single place.

Service Pack was released up to SP4, which was released on March 5, 2001.

=== Host Integration Server 2000 ===
SNA Server code-name "Babylon" was rebranded to "Host Integration Server" from this version and released on September 26, 2000. This version worked with Windows 2000, SQL Server 2000, BizTalk Server 2000, and Commerce Server 2000 to utilize the new generation of technologies such as COM+, XML and SOAP. The key new features include bidirectional application and data integration via enhanced COMTI and OLE DB support to 3270 I/O-based Customer Information Control System (CICS) applications, which was a result from strategic partnership with Microsoft and Software AG. The new adapter was called "Software AG CICS 3270 Adapter for Host Integration Server 2000".

Host Integration Server 2000 Web Clients were released to enable users to connect to 3270 and 5250 through HIS 2000.

Host Integration Server 2000 was included in BackOffice Server 2000.

Service Pack was released up to SP2, which was released on March 30, 2005.

=== Host Integration Server 2004 ===
New features in HIS 2004 included extending the Transaction Integrator to support AS/400 systems.

=== Host Integration Server 2016 ===
HIS 2016 added support for Windows 10, and Windows Server 2016. The CU3 update added support for Windows Server 2019. Improvements for telemetry and configuration were also added.

=== Host Integration Server 2020 ===
HIS 2020 added support for Windows 11, Windows Server 2022 and Visual Studio 2022. Support for Group Managed Service Accounts was also added. There were accessibility improvements to the TI Configuration tool and SNA Manager. HIS 2020 introduced telemetry and error reporting capabilities that monitor installation, configuration, and runtime behaviors across various components, including SNA services, Transaction Integrator, and DRDA Service, to improve product quality and reliability.

=== Host Integration Server 2028 ===
In May 2026, Microsoft announced Host Integration Server 2028 as a standalone successor to HIS 2020, separate from BizTalk Server. General availability is planned for September 2027. The announced changes include migration to .NET 10, removal of 32-bit support and several older providers and interfaces, and planned post-release support for Microsoft Entra ID and Azure Arc. Microsoft also plans to make non-SNA features available on Linux through NuGet packages after the main release. The product is expected to retain SNA connectivity, 3270 and 5250 sessions, Transaction Integrator support for CICS and IMS, DB2 connectivity, and IBM MQ integration.

== See also ==
- Data-link switching
