= IBM 37xx =

Series of mainframe communication controllers manufactured by IBM

IBM 37xx series

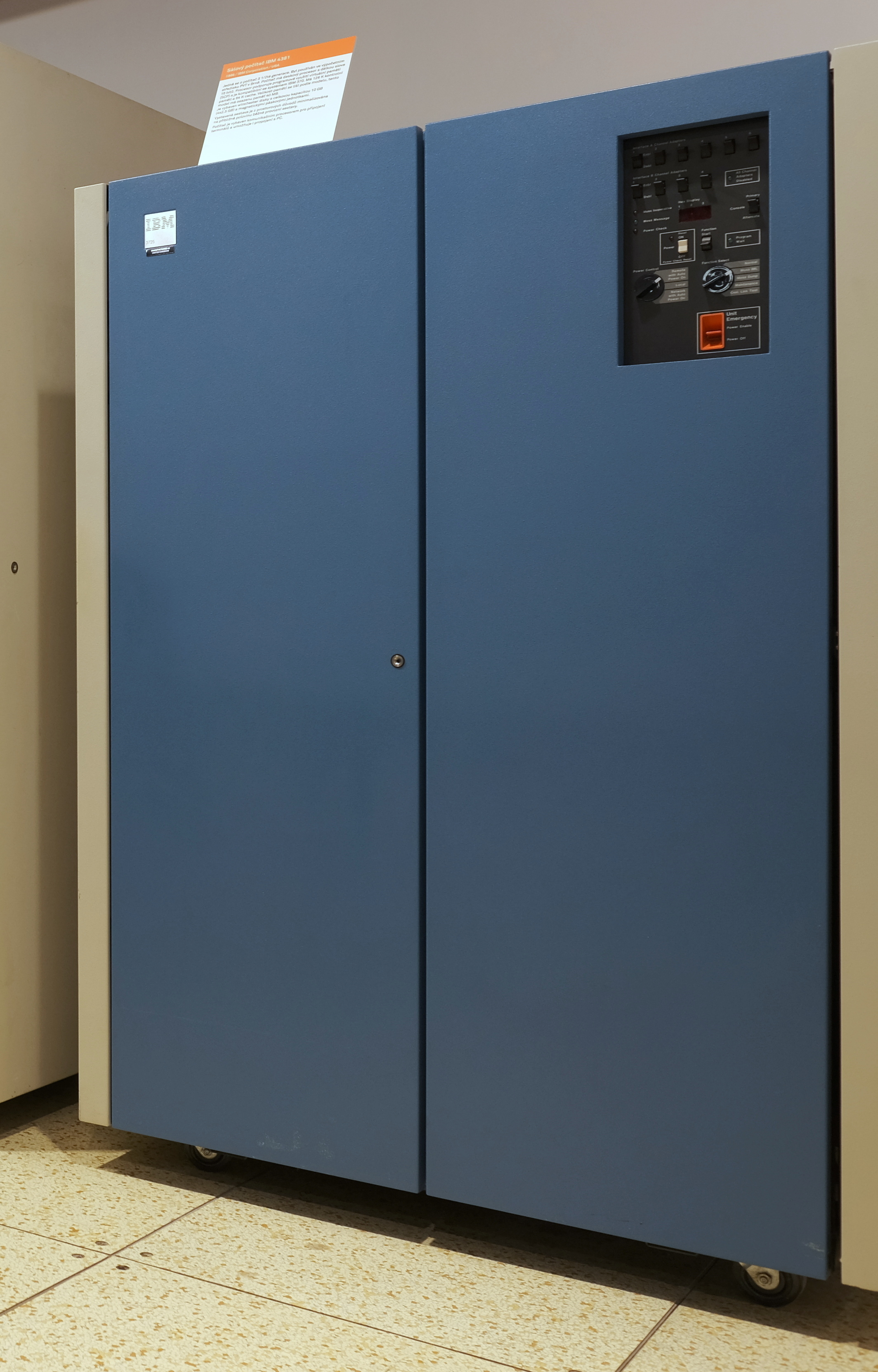
- IBM 3725 controller
- Manufacturer: IBM
- Released: 1972; 54 years ago
- Discontinued: 2002
- Predecessor: IBM 270x series
- Successor: Communications Controller for Linux software

IBM 37xx (or 37x5) is a family of IBM Systems Network Architecture (SNA) programmable front-end processors used mainly in mainframe environments.

All members of the family ran one of three IBM-supplied programs.

- Emulation Program (EP) mimicked the operation of the older IBM 270x non-programmable controllers.
- Network Control Program (NCP) supported Systems Network Architecture devices.
- Partitioned Emulation Program (PEP) combined the functions of the two.

== Models ==
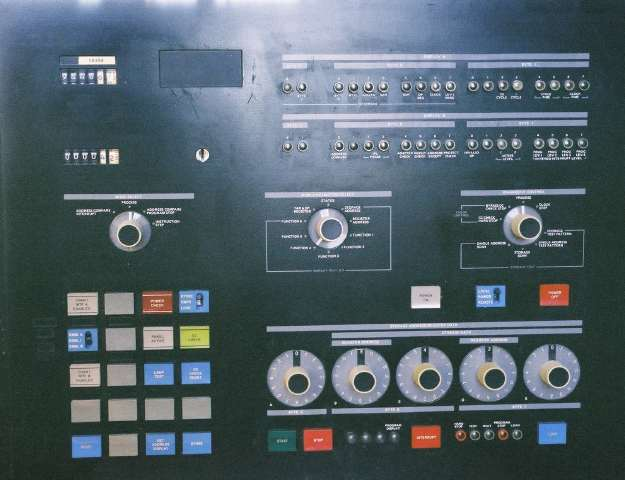
3705 Front Panel

=== 370x series ===
- 3705 — the oldest of the family, introduced in 1972 to replace the non-programmable IBM 270x family. The 3705 could control up to 352 communications lines.
- 3704 was a smaller version, introduced in 1973. It supported up to 32 lines.

=== 371x ===
The 3710 communications controller was introduced in 1984.

=== 372x series ===
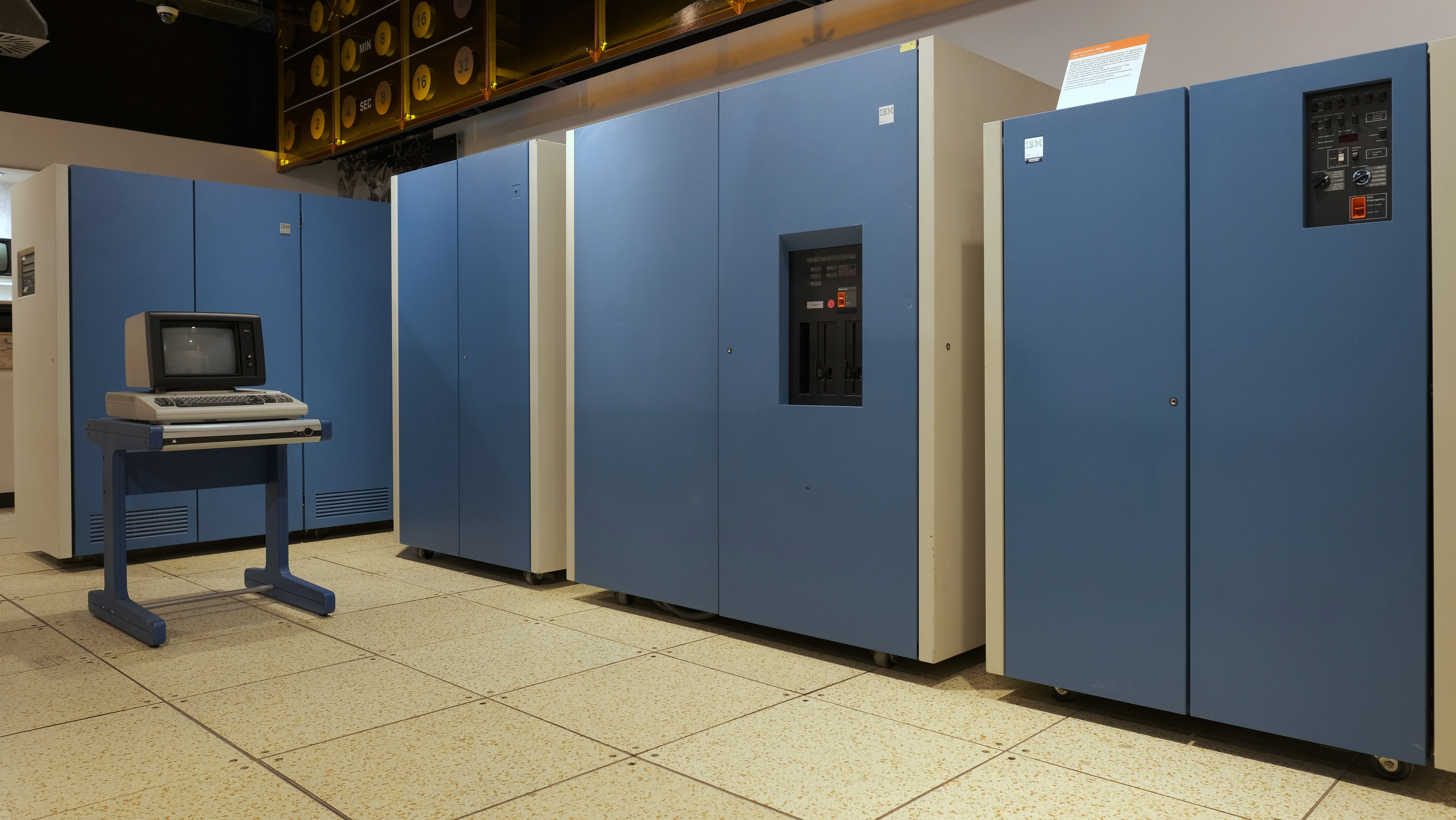
The 3725 controller (right small-height rack), connected to an IBM 4381 system

The 3725 and the 3720 systems were announced in 1983. The 3725 replaced the hardware line scanners used on previous 370x machines with multiple microcoded processors.

- The 3725 was a large-scale node and front end processor.
- The 3720 was a smaller version of the 3725, which was sometimes used as a remote concentrator.
- The 3726 was an expansion unit for the 3725.

With the expansion unit, the 3725 could support up to 256 lines at data rates up to 256 kbit/s, and connect to up to eight mainframe channels.

Marketing of the 372x machines was discontinued in 1989.

IBM discontinued support for the 3705, 3720, 3725 in 1999.

=== 374x series ===
- The 3745, announced in 1988, provides up to eight T1 circuits. At the time of the announcement, IBM was estimated to have nearly 85% of the over US$825 million market for communications controllers over rivals such as NCR Comten and Amdahl Corporation. The 3745 is no longer marketed, but still supported and used.
- The 3746 "Nways Controller" model 900, unveiled in 1992, was an expansion unit for the 3745 supporting additional Token Ring and ESCON connections. A stand-alone model 950 appeared in 1995.

== Successors ==
IBM no longer manufactures 37xx processors. The last models, the 3745/46, were withdrawn from marketing in 2002. Replacement software products are Communications Controller for Linux on System z and Enterprise Extender.

== Clones ==
Several companies produced clones of 37xx controllers, including NCR COMTEN and Amdahl Corporation.
