= IBM Cross System Product =

Application generator for IBM mainframes

IBM's Cross System Product (CSP) was an application generator intended to create online systems on IBM's mainframe platforms. Introduced in 1981, CSP consisted of a set of source code generators that allowed developers to interactively define, test, generate, and execute application programs. CSP was composed of two products:

- Cross System Product/Application Development (CSP/AD) - development environment.
- Cross System Product/Application Execution (CSP/AE) - runtime environment.

CSP version 3 was released in 1986 with extended functions:

- DB2 support in CICS/OS/VS and MVS/TSO environment
- SQL/DS support in VSE and VM/SP environment
- MVS/XA (31bit addressing) support

The 1987 SAA announcement cast doubt on IBM's commitment to CSP – it "wasn't silent on CSP; it dismembered it.".

The last version of CSP, version 4.1, went out of support at the end of 2001.

In 1994, IBM released a successor product called VisualGen which incorporated "the ability to develop client/server applications (particularly the addition of graphical user interfaces (GUIs) to applications), the ability to access data from non-IBM vendors’ data stores, and the ability to execute application in operating environments beyond the mainframe." In 1996, this product was again renamed to VisualAge Generator. VisualAge Generator was withdrawn from service in 2009 and succeeded by Rational Business Developer.

== See also ==
- Rational Software
