= 5250 =

5250 Can refer to:

- The year in the 6th millennium
- IBM 5250
