= Network Control Program =

Network Control Program might refer to:

- Network Control Program (ARPANET), the software in hosts which implemented the original protocol suite of the ARPANET, the Network Control Protocol
- IBM Network Control Program
