= IBM 3767 =

IBM 3767 Communication Terminal is a serial printer terminal that employed dot matrix print-head technology and, for the first time, the Synchronous Data Link Control (SDLC) communications protocol set under IBM's Systems Network Architecture (SNA). It was introduced in 1974 and was used widely during the late 1970s to 1990s, for attachment to IBM System/360 and System/370 mainframe computers and IBM System/7 as an alternative to a 2741 typewriter terminal.

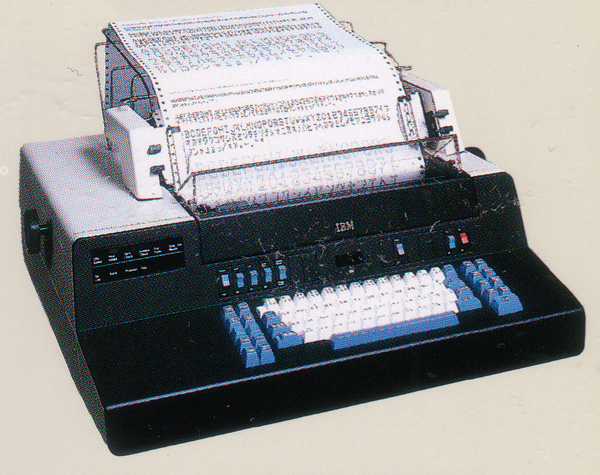
IBM 3767 Communication Terminal

== Needs for more efficient computer terminals ==
During the late 1960 and 1970s, the computing environment expanded beyond the large computer rooms based on card input/output and started to allow data input and output terminals from remote locations. For such purposes, printer terminals such as the IBM 2741, using the traditional asynchronous serial communication (start-stop signaling), and display terminals such as IBM 2260 and IBM 3270, using the new communications protocol set (Binary Synchronous Communications or BSC), became available.

There were needs to use a new more efficient communications protocol set and to make available a more efficient and reliable remote printer and display terminals. To satisfy such needs, IBM 3767 serial printer and IBM 3770 communications system (including a line printer) became available as part of the "Advanced Communications Function" (ACF) announcement which included the new System Network Architecture (SNA) and Synchronous Data Link Control (SDLC) communications protocol set, followed by another announcement in July, 1975, which included IBM 3760 Data Entry Station and the new models of IBM 3270 display stations, and IBM 3790 communication system.

== 3767 functions, features and models ==
IBM 3767 Communication Terminal had the following functions:

- IBM's own wire matrix, serial print-head technology
- Keyboard
- Communications: SNA/SDLC or BSC
- Communications speed from 200/300 to 19,200 bits per second
- US English or one of the world's other major languages

There were several models depending on the following features:

- 80 or 120 printing positions
- With or without internal modem

They attach to IBM System/360 or IBM System/370 mainframe computers through IBM 3705 communications controllers, and supported by 3705 Network Control Program and mainframe software such as CICS and IMS.

IBM 3767 was developed by IBM Systems Development Division's Fujisawa (later Yamato) laboratory in Japan. It was manufactured at IBM Research Triangle Park plant in North Carolina, United States, Fujisawa plant, and Greenock, Scotland, plant in UK.

== IBM 3760 ==
The IBM 3760 Data Entry Station was announced in 1975, and included the IBM 3767 as an attached terminal. The 3760 was part of the IBM 3790 distributed processing family.

== See also ==
- IBM System/360 and System/370
- IBM 2741
- IBM 3770
- IBM 3270
- Systems Network Architecture (SNA) and Binary Synchronous Communications (BSC)
- IBM SYSTEM/7
