= Hardware stress test =

Severe test for safety and performance of computer hardware

A stress test (sometimes called a torture test) of computer hardware is a form of deliberately intense and thorough testing used to determine the stability of a given system or entity. It involves testing beyond normal operational capacity, often to a breaking point, in order to observe the results.

Reasons can include: to determine breaking points and safe usage limits; to confirm that the intended specifications are being met; to search for issues inside of a product; to determine modes of failure (how exactly a system may fail), and to test stable operation of a part or system outside standard usage. Reliability engineers often test items under expected stress or even under accelerated stress in order to determine the operating life of the item or to determine modes of failure.

The term stress test as it relates to hardware (including electronics, physical devices, nuclear power plants, etc.) is likely to have different refined meanings in specific contexts. One example is fatigue testing in materials.

== Hardware stress test ==
Stress testing, in general, should put computer hardware under exaggerated levels of stress in order to ensure stability when used in a normal environment. These can include extremes of workload, type of task, memory use, thermal load (heat), clock speed, or voltages. Memory and CPU are two components that are commonly stress tested in this way.

There is considerable overlap between stress testing software and benchmarking software, since both seek to assess and measure maximum performance. Of the two, stress testing software aims to test stability by trying to force a system to fail; benchmarking aims to measure and assess the maximum performance possible at a given task or function.

When modifying the operating parameters of a CPU, such as temperature, humidity, overclocking, underclocking, overvolting, and undervolting, it may be necessary to verify if the new parameters (usually CPU core voltage and frequency) are suitable for heavy CPU loads. This is done by running a CPU-intensive program for extended periods of time, to test whether the computer hangs or crashes. CPU stress testing is also referred to as torture testing. Software that is suitable for torture testing should typically run instructions that utilise the entire chip rather than only a few of its units. Stress testing a CPU over the course of 24 hours at 100% load is, in most cases, sufficient to determine that the CPU will function correctly in normal usage scenarios such as in a desktop computer, where CPU usage typically fluctuates at low levels (50% and under).

Hardware stress testing and stability are subjective and may vary according to how the system will be used. A stress test for a system running 24/7 or that will perform error sensitive tasks such as distributed computing or "folding" projects may differ from one that needs to be able to run a single game with a reasonable amount of reliability. For example, a comprehensive guide on overclocking Sandy Bridge found that:

Even though in the past IntelBurnTest was just as good, it seems that something in the SB uArch [Sandy Bridge microarchitecture] is more heavily stressed with Prime95 ... IBT really does pull more power [make greater thermal demands]. But ... Prime95 failed first every time, and it failed when IBT would pass. So same as Sandy Bridge, Prime95 is a better stability tester for Sandy Bridge-E than IBT/LinX.

Stability is subjective; some might call stability enough to run their game, other like folders [folding projects] might need something that is just as stable as it was at stock, and ... would need to run Prime95 for at least 12 hours to a day or two to deem that stable ... There are [bench testers] who really don’t care for stability like that and will just say if it can [complete] a benchmark it is stable enough. No one is wrong and no one is right. Stability is subjective. [But] 24/7 stability is not subjective.

An engineer at ASUS advised in a 2012 article on overclocking an Intel X79 system, that it is important to choose testing software carefully in order to obtain useful results:

Unvalidated stress tests are not advised (such as Prime95 or LinX or other comparable applications). For high grade CPU/IMC and System Bus testing Aida64 is recommended along with general applications usage like PC Mark 7. Aida has an advantage as it is stability test has been designed for the Sandy Bridge E architecture and test specific functions like AES, AVX and other instruction sets that prime and like synthetics do not touch. As such not only does it load the CPU 100% but will also test other parts of CPU not used under applications like Prime 95. Other applications to consider are SiSoft 2012 or Passmark BurnIn. Be advised validation has not been completed using Prime 95 version 26 and LinX (10.3.7.012) and OCCT 4.1.0 beta 1 but once we have internally tested to ensure at least limited support and operation.

=== Software commonly used in hardware stress testing ===
- AIDA64
- IBM Teleprocessing Network Simulator
- IBM Workload Simulator
- Intel processor diagnostic test
- Intel Burn Test
- LinX (AVX)
- Memtest86+ – memory
- OCCT
- Passmark Burn-in Test
- Prime95, and derivatives such as HyperPi – CPU/heat
- Siege
- S&M
- Tsung - free software tool

== Reliability ==
Hardware Reliability Verification includes temperature and humidity test, mechanical vibration test, shock test, collision test, drop test, dustproof and waterproof test, and other environmental reliability tests.

Growth in safety-critical applications for automotive electronics significantly increases the IC design reliability challenge.

Hardware Testing of Electric Hot Water Heaters Providing Energy Storage and Demand Response Through Model Predictive Control is from Institute of Electrical and Electronics Engineers, written by Halamay, D.A., Starrett, M and Brekken, T.K.A. The author first discusses that a classical steady state model commonly used for simulation of electric hot water heaters can be inaccurate. The paper presents results from hardware testing which demonstrate that systems of water heaters under Model Predictive Control can be reliably dispatched to deliver set-point levels of power to within 2% error. Then the author presents experimental results which show a promising pathway to control hot water heaters as energy storage systems that are capable of delivering flexible capacity and fast acting ancillary services on a firm basis.

The journal Advanced Circuit Reliability Verification for Robust Design discusses the models used on circuit reliability verification and application of these models. It first discusses how the growth in safety-critical applications for automotive electronics significant increases the IC design reliability challenge. Then the author starts to discuss the latest Synopsys' AMS solution for robust design. This part of the article is very technical, mostly talking about how AMS can strengthen the reliability for full-chip mixed-signal verification. This article can be a useful source for investigating why it is important to focus more on reliability verification nowadays.

== See also ==
- Black box testing
- Burn-in
- Destructive testing
- Highly Accelerated Life Test
- Load and performance test tools
- Load testing
- Stress test for other uses (disambiguation)
- Stress testing (software)
