= Data-Link Switching =

Tunneling protocol

Data-Link Switching (DLSw) is a tunneling protocol designed to tunnel unroutable, non-IP based protocols such as IBM Systems Network Architecture (SNA) and NBF over an IP network.

DLSw was initially documented in IETF RFC 1434 in 1993. In 1995 it was further documented in the IETF RFC 1795. DLSw version 2 was presented in 1997 in IETF RFC 2166 as an improvement to RFC 1795. Cisco Systems has its own proprietary extensions to DLSw in DLSw+. According to Cisco, DLSw+ is 100% IETF RFC 1795 compliant but includes some proprietary extensions that can be used when both devices are Cisco.

Some organisations are starting to replace DLSw tunneling with the more modern Enterprise Extender (EE) protocol which is a feature of IBM APPN on z/OS systems. Microsoft refers to EE as IPDLC. Enterprise Extender uses UDP traffic at the transport layer rather than the network layer. Cisco deploy Enterprise Extender on their hardware via the IOS feature known as SNAsW (SNA Switch).

== See also ==
- Microsoft Host Integration Server
- Synchronous Data Link Control
- Systems Network Architecture
