= Communications Controller for Linux =

Communications Controller for Linux (Communications Controller for Linux on System z or CCL) is an IBM software product announced in 2005 that runs under Linux on IBM Z and emulates an IBM 37xx communications controller. CCL runs unmodified IBM Network Control Program (NCP) to allow consolidation of an SNA network infrastructure to IP. According to IBM "SNA traffic enters and leaves CCL as SNA network flows over an OSA adapter. However, your wide area network infrastructure does not need to be SNA. You can consolidate your SNA traffic and use tunneling such as data link switching (DLSw) to encapsulate the SNA communication over an IP network."

CCL supports Ethernet and Token Ring local area network (LAN) connectivity directly, and other connectivity through a DLSw router. X.25 requires IBM's NPSI software plus a third party package. CCL does not support Bisync or start-stop.

According to IBM figures, CCL offers the performance of an "average 3745."
