= IBM 3745 =

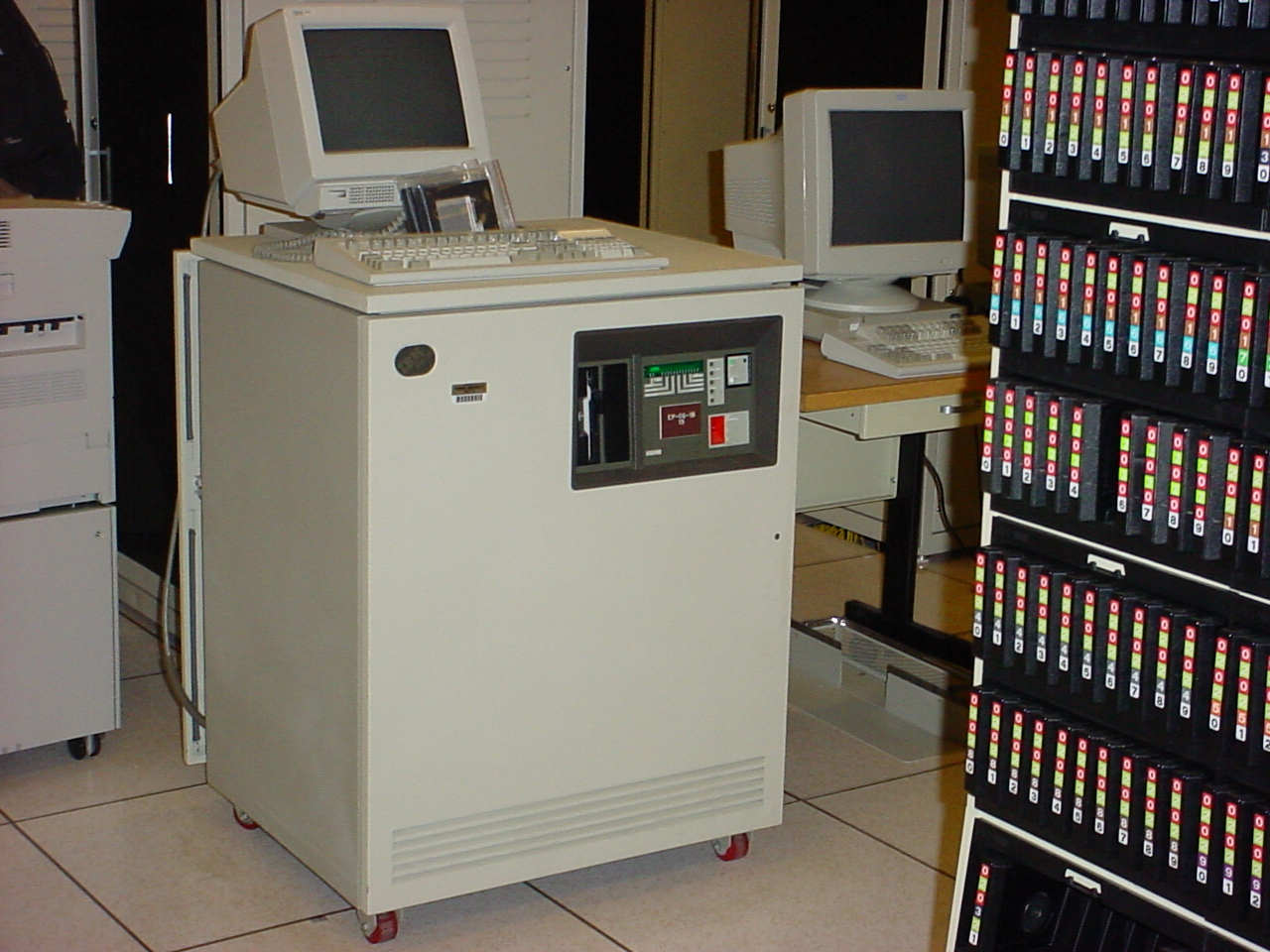
IBM 3745-170

The IBM 3745 is the latest and last of a 37xx family of communications controllers for the IBM mainframe environment. As of mid-2009 there were an estimated 7,000+ of the larger 3745 models still in active production status, down from 20,000 or more in 2007. The 3745 and associated 3746 models were once heavily used within financial, insurance and retail industries as well as within government agencies globally. However, today most organizations have migrated away from the use of 3745s. IBM's Enterprise Extender and the Communication Controller for Linux on System z (CCL) have largely displaced the older 3745s. IBM announced in September 2002 that it would no longer manufacture new 3745s, but IBM continues to support the hardware by providing worldwide maintenance service, by providing microcode releases and by supporting the associated software including NCP (Network Control Program) and the virtual telecommunications access method (VTAM). IBM has announced end-of-service dates for Japan, Europe and the Middle East, but has not yet announced end-of-service for the Americas and parts of Asia.

The latest and most commonly used models of the 3745 are the single Central Control Unit (CCU) 3745-31A and the dual CCU 3745-61A models. These are usually operated in conjunction with the 3746-900 expansion unit (aka 900 frame). The 900 frame provides multiple T1, token ring, V.35 and V.24 attachments on the front end, and connects on the back end to the mainframe host with multiple ESCON serial fiber optic channels. An operator and service interface to the 3745 and 900 frame is provided by an IBM Service Processor which operates under the control of the IBM OS/2 operating system and proprietary code.

== Production ==
IBM maintained a contract manufacturing facility for the 3745/3746 product set in Havant, Hampshire, United Kingdom until the end of 2002. This facility was operated by Xyratex Technology Limited. When production at Havant ceased, the remaining inventory of new product, features, parts and components was purchased by Mid-Atlantic Research and Services, Inc. That company built and operated a re-manufacturing facility in Maryland, USA for the purpose of providing upgrade kits and service parts for those large companies that continued to rely upon the 3745/3746 for critical network applications. Re-manufacturing continued in the US at the Mid-Atlantic Research Maryland facility until late 2013. In 2014 Enterprise Infrastructure Solutions, LLC (EIS) according to Jim Richmond of Mokena, Illinois purchased Mid-Atlantic Research for an undisclosed amount.

== Replacements ==
IBM does not market a direct hardware replacement for the IBM 3745 providing all of the 3745/3746 interfaces. However, IBM offers a software emulation product that provides a subset of 3745/3746 function, IBM's Communications Controller for Linux on System z. CCL is a software emulation that runs on the mainframe under Linux on System z. The NCP (Network Control Program) licensed for use in the 3745/3746 continues to be licensed for use with CCL. CCL employs the IBM OSA adapter for physical connectivity. Low and medium speed lines must be supported through router ports. Alternatively, in many cases it is possible to migrate away from networking protocols supported by the 3745 and CCL, relying solely on the SNA and TCP/IP protocol support provided by z/OS Communications Server.
