= Common Programming Interface for Communications =

Common Programming Interface for Communications (CPI-C) is an application programming interface (API) developed by IBM in 1987 to provide a platform-independent communications interface for the IBM Systems Application Architecture-based network, and to standardise programming access to SNA LU 6.2. CPI-C was part of IBM Systems Application Architecture (SAA), an attempt to standardise APIs across all IBM platforms.

It was adopted in 1992 by X/Open as an open systems standard, identified as standard C210, and documented in X/Open Developers Specification: CPI-C.

== See also ==
- IBM Advanced Program-to-Program Communication
