= IBM 3720 =

The IBM 3720 was a communications controller (front-end processor) made by IBM, suitable for use with IBM System/390. The 3720, introduced in 1986, was capable of supporting up to 60 communications lines, and was a smaller version of the 3725. Official service support was withdrawn in 1999 in favour of the IBM 3745.

The IBM 3720 is unrelated to the similarly numbered IBM 3270 display terminal system.
