= Virtual Telecommunications Access Method =

Virtual Telecommunications Access Method (VTAM) is the IBM subsystem that implements Systems Network Architecture (SNA) for mainframe environments. VTAM provides an application programming interface (API) for communication applications, and controls communication equipment such as adapters and controllers. In modern terminology, VTAM provides a communication stack and device drivers.

== History ==
VTAM was introduced in 1974 after a series of delays as a major component of SNA along with the 370x Network Control Program (NCP) and Synchronous Data Link Control (SDLC).

In IBM terminology, VTAM is an access method software allowing application programs to read and write data to and from external devices. It is called 'virtual' because it was introduced at the time when IBM was introducing virtual storage by upgrading the operating systems of the System/360 series to virtual storage versions. VTAM was supposed to be the successor to the older telecommunications access methods, such as Basic Telecommunications Access Method (BTAM) and Telecommunications Access Method (TCAM), which were maintained for compatibility reasons. As such, VTAM is comparable with the Virtual Storage Access Method (VSAM), which was at that time a new and supposedly converged access method for disk storage.

=== ACF/VTAM ===
Originally, VTAM was provided free of charge like most systems software of that time. However, VTAM 2 was the last version to be freely available. ACF/VTAM (Advanced Communication Function/Virtual Telecommunications Access Method) was introduced in 1976 and was provided for a licence fee. The major new feature of ACF/VTAM was the Multisystem Networking Facility, which introduced "implementation of intersystem communication among multiple S/370s.".

A limited version of ACF/VTAM known as ACF/VTAME (Advanced Communications Function for the Virtual Telecommunications Access Method Entry) was made available for DOS/VSE systems running on the IBM 4300.

=== SNA Services ===
Starting with OS/390, IBM bundled VTAM and TCP/IP into Communications Server and rebranded VTAM as the SNA Services feature of Communications Server. VTAM is used in multiple enterprises as of September 2019.

== Features ==
VTAM supports several network protocols, including SDLC, Token Ring, start-stop, Bisync, local (channel attached) 3270 devices, and later TCP/IP.

In a VTAM network, communication took place through an integrated communication adapter in the mainframe itself, or by a separate programmable front-end processor, the IBM 3745/3746 Communications Processor, with its own operating system, the Network Control Program NCP. These machines are no longer actively marketed by IBM, but are still supported. IBM provides hardware maintenance and microcode updates for the estimated 20,000 installed 3745/3746 controllers. A robust third party industry of smaller 3745/3746 specialty companies provide such controllers, upgrades, features, and related support services. VTAM and SNA are still in use by many enterprises.

Initially, VTAM only allowed communication between mainframes and peripheral equipment such as terminals, distributed processors and minicomputers. Later, 'cross-domain' resources were introduced (not to be confused with TCP/IP domains) allowing SNA networks with more than one mainframe. A subsequent development was SNA Network Interconnect (SNI), allowing networks of different organizational entities (firms) to be interconnected with a high degree of independence. Finally, Advanced Peer to Peer Networking functions (APPN) were added to VTAM. In APPN the mainframe is no longer the heart of the network, but all nodes in the network are considered as peers. One of the reasons why APPN was introduced was to act as a DECnet-killer, but by the time APPN was actually shipped the popularity of DECnet had already declined. APPN was considered overly complex and as of 2012 has been largely superseded by TCP/IP.
