= VIP terminal =

VIP (Visual Information Projection) terminals are a series of computer terminals by Honeywell/Bull, used to connect to their mainframe systems.
