= Bend radius =

Minimum radius an item can be bent to without damage

Bend radius, which is measured to the inside curvature, is the minimum radius one can bend a pipe, tube, sheet, cable or hose without kinking it, damaging it, or shortening its life. The smaller the bend radius, the greater the material flexibility (as the radius of curvature decreases, the curvature increases). The diagram to the right illustrates a cable with a seven-centimeter bend radius.

Cable with a seven-centimeter bend radius

The minimum bend radius is the radius below which an object such as a cable should not be bent.

== Fiber optics ==
The minimum bend radius is of particular importance in the handling of fiber-optic cables, which are often used in telecommunications. The minimum bending radius will vary with different cable designs. The manufacturer should specify the minimum radius to which the cable may safely be bent during installation and for the long term. The former is somewhat larger than the latter. The minimum bend radius is in general also a function of tensile stresses, e.g., during installation, while being bent around a sheave while the fiber or cable is under tension. If no minimum bend radius is specified, one is usually safe in assuming a minimum long-term low-stress radius not less than 15 times the cable diameter, or 2 inches.

Besides mechanical destruction, another reason why one should avoid excessive bending of fiber-optic cables is to minimize microbending and macrobending losses. Microbending causes light attenuation induced by deformation of the fiber while macrobending causes the leakage of light through the fiber cladding and this is more likely to happen where the fiber is excessively bent.

== Other applications ==
Strain gauges also have a minimum bending radius. This radius is the radius below which the strain gauge will malfunction.

For metal tubing, bend radius is to the centerline of tubing, not the exterior.
