= IBM SQL/DS =

Database access software

SQL/DS (Structured Query Language/Data System), released in 1981, was IBM's first commercial relational-database management system. It implemented the SQL database-query language.

SQL/DS ran on the DOS/VSE and VM/CMS operating systems. A little later, IBM also introduced Db2, another SQL-based DBMS, this one for the MVS operating system. The two products have coexisted since then; however, SQL/DS was rebranded as "DB2 for VM and VSE" in the late 1990s.

== Third party software ==
Software AG's Natural 4GL was an early third-party software product that facilitated using SQL/DS. Software AG used the name Natural 2/SQL-DS and, later on, for a related offering, Natural 2/DB2.
