= Enterprise Extender =

Standard internet transport protocol

- Communication protocol
- Abbreviation: EE
- Developer(s): Internet Engineering Task Force
- Introduction: May 1999; 25 years ago
- RFC(s): 2352

IBM Enterprise Extender (EE) is a standard internet transport protocol for IBM Systems Network Architecture (SNA) High Performance Routing traffic over IP. Enterprise Extender is analogous to, but independent of, Transmission Control Protocol (TCP). EE and TCP traffic can be carried over the same connections.

Enterprise extender was developed by the Internet Engineering Task Force and the APPN Implementers' Workshop, and standardized in 1997 in Internet RFC 2352.

Enterprise Extender traffic is transmitted as UDP datagrams. It is integrated with Systems Network Architecture in z/OS systems, and implemented in software, such as IBM Personal Communications of Windows (PCOM), or hardware such as Cisco routers with the SNA Switching Services feature (SNASw), in remote systems.
