= IBM 5250 =

Family of block-oriented terminals

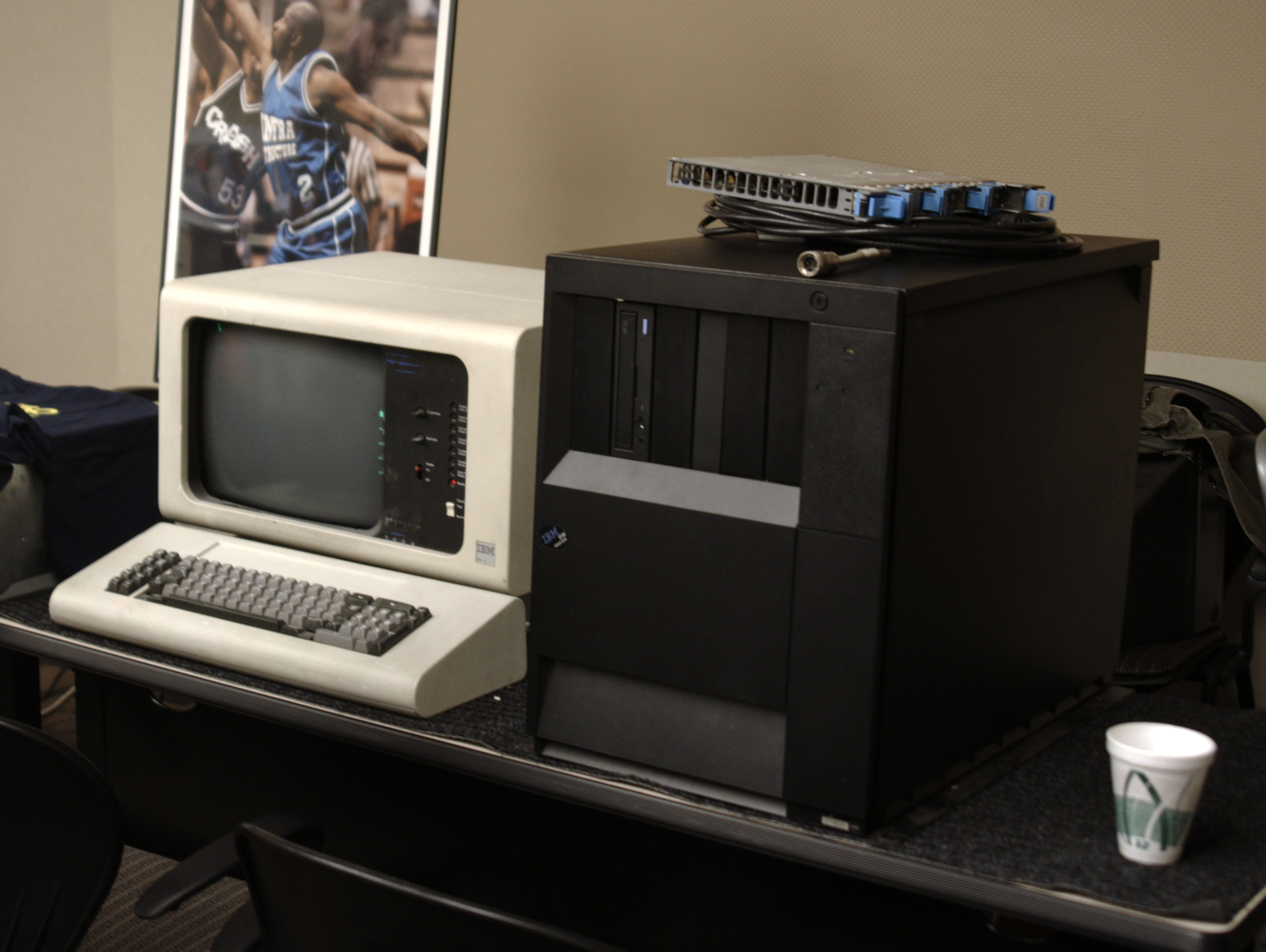
IBM 5251, connected to an AS/400 system

IBM 5250 is a family of block-oriented terminals originally introduced with the IBM System/34 midrange computer systems in 1977. It also connects to the later System/36, System/38, and IBM AS/400 systems, and to IBM Power Systems systems running IBM i, as well as the Series/1 minicomputer.

== Components ==
5250 devices can be directly attached to the host or communicate remotely using Synchronous Data Link Control (SDLC) at up to 9600bit/s. Devices can also be clustered or daisy-chained.

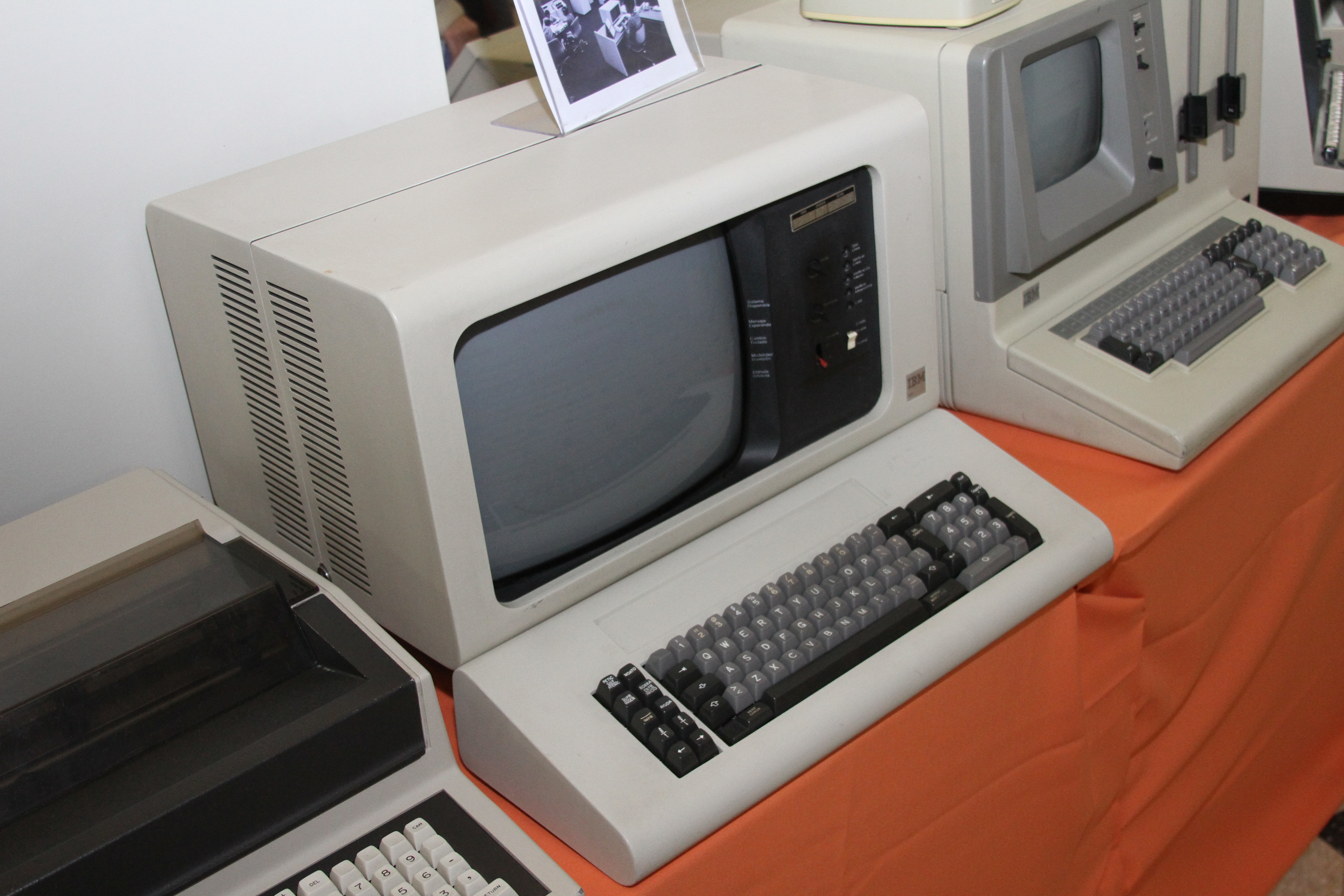
IBM 5251 display station on front of IBM 5120 system

In 1980 the 5250 system consisted of the following components:

- 5251 Display Station. The monochrome text-only display can be either 960 characters, formatted as 12 lines of 80 characters, or 1920 characters as 24 lines of 80 characters. Upper and lower case is standard. Text attributes consist of blink, high intensity, reverse video, non-display, underscore, and a unique column separator that causes the field to be preceded and followed by a vertical bar. 5251 and 5252 input format control attributes are optimized for data entry applications and offer significant enhancements over previous 3270 terminals.
- 5252 Dual Display Station. The 5252 features a single CRT displayed 12 lines each on two different sides back to back in a single case, with separate keyboards. The 5252 was not part of the initial announcement.
- 5256 printer. The 5256 is a tabletop serial dot matrix printer with three models providing speeds of 40, 60, or 120cps and a print line of 132 characters.

=== 5251/5252 format control ===
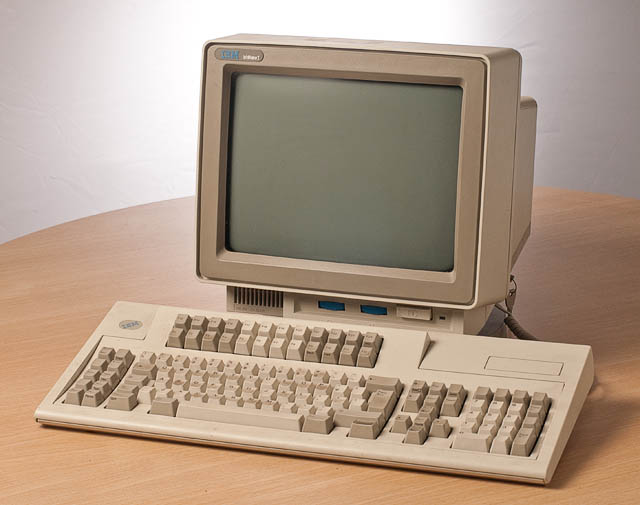
IBM 3486 Terminal, a later terminal with 5250 functionality, capable of supporting two independent sessions concurrently, and with an amber screen. The keyboard is a 122-key variant of the Model M; the original 5251-1 had a much smaller beam-spring keyboard.

Field attributes also define the type of data the operator can enter into a field, and specify other control information for the field.

- A field can be defined as alpha only, numeric only, or alphanumeric.
- Auto enter simulates an ENTER key press at the conclusion of the field.
- Bypass automatically skips over a field in the screen.
- Duplicate enable allows the operator to press the DUP key in a field, entering a special code which is interpreted by the application program – typically duplicating data in this field from the previous record or line.
- Field exit required forces the operator to manually exit this field, rather than automatically advancing to the next field after entering the last character.
- Mandatory entry specifies that the operator must enter data in this field and is not allowed to tab over it.
- Monocase translates lower-case characters entered into this field to upper-case.
- Mandatory fill specifies that this field must be entirely filled if any data is entered into it.
- Right adjust will right adjust data entered in a field when the operator exits the field.
- Signed numeric reserves the rightmost position of a field for a sign – blank for positive or '-' for negative.

=== Terminal status lights ===
On a 5251 type terminal featured five status lights on the front of the unit:

- System Available light: If lit, this terminal is connected to the host system and is receiving information from it.
- Message Waiting light: Other users, and the system itself, can send messages to workstations. If lit, there is at least one message that has not been seen yet. When a program ends or when the user signs on, the message(s) will be shown.
- Insert light: The Insert key has been pressed. Characters after the cursor will shift right when text is keyed. Press Insert again to cease Insert Mode.
- Caps Lock light: The Caps Lock key has been pressed.
- Keyboard Shift light: The Shift key is being pressed.

== Historical origins ==
The 5250 is a block-oriented terminal similar to, but not compatible with, the IBM 3270. Robustly constructed, 5251 terminals weigh roughly 36 kilograms (79 lb). The devices generate an audible clicking sound as the user types, similar to the electronic typewriters of the era.

The 5250 data stream definition has been refined over time to include GUI elements such as pop-up windowing, check and option boxes, mouse handling, and pull-down menus. The IBM 3180 added support for seven colors - pink, red, blue, yellow, green, white, and turquoise. A protocol called the IBM 5250 Data Stream interpreted field attributes such as blinking, non-display, high intensity, reverse image, underline, and column separators and was used in combination to create colors. Normal text was presented as green on a 3180 color terminal, but high intensity became white. Column separators became yellow. Blinking became red. Underlined text was presented as blue. High intensity blinking became pink. High intensity column separators became turquoise.

The term "5250" now refers to the data stream itself. No physical 5250 terminals with their bulky twinax cables still exist, although they were occasionally still used to provide a "connection of last resort," hard-wired to the host computer. Today, it is more common to use PC or web-based terminal emulation packages that can interpret and display 5250 data streams.

== Telnet 5250 ==
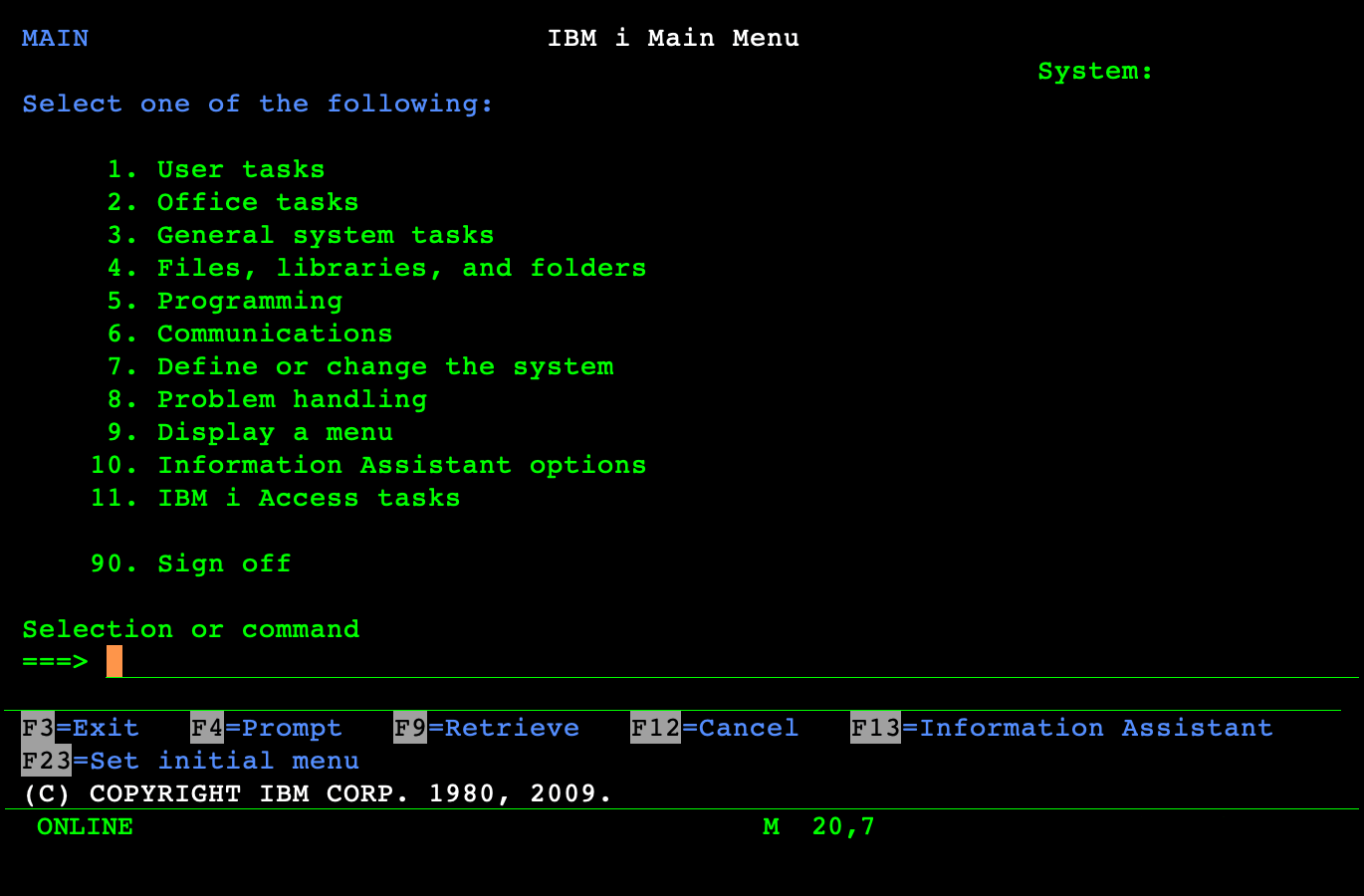
Main Menu of IBM i 7.1 on a TN5250 emulator

Telnet 5250, or TN5250 describes either the process of sending and receiving 5250 data streams using the telnet protocol or the software that emulates a 5250 class terminal communication via that process. TN5250 allows a 5250 terminal emulator to communicate over a TCP/IP network instead of an SNA network. Standard telnet clients cannot be used as a substitute for TN5250 clients, as they use a different data stream format.

== Interfacing 5250 terminals with commodity hardware ==
An interface was created to connect to the Twinax port of a 5250 terminal and communicate with it like an AS/400 host. It currently provides VT52 emulation and a shell on the system to which the adapter is connected.

== List of IBM 5250 Twinax terminals ==
=== IBM 3179 ===
The IBM 3179 exists as a 3270 and a 5250 terminal.

=== IBM 3180 ===
The IBM 3180 exists as a 3270 and a 5250 terminal.

=== IBM 3196 ===
80x24 characters.

Models:

- 3196 model A10: Green screen.
- 3196 model B10: Amber-Gold screen.

=== IBM 3197 ===
Models:

- IBM 3197 model C10 (1920 characters)
- IBM 3197 model C20 (1920 characters)
- IBM 3197 model D10 (3564 characters)
- IBM 3197 model D20 (3564 characters)
- IBM 3197 model D40 (15 inch green phosphor)

=== IBM 3477 ===
Models:

- IBM 3477 model HAX (14-inch amber-gold monochrome monitor)
- IBM 3477 model HGX (14-inch green monochrome monitor)
- IBM 3477 model HCX (14-inch color monitor)
- IBM 3477 model HDX (15-inch green monitor)

=== IBM 3486 ===
Models:

- IBM 3486 model BAX (14-inch amber-gold monitor)
- IBM 3486 model BGx (14-inch green monitor)

=== IBM 3487 ===
Models:

- IBM 3487 model HAX (15-inch amber-gold monitor)
- IBM 3487 model HCX (14-inch color monitor)
- IBM 3487 model HGX (15-inch green monitor)

=== IBM 3488 ===
Does not include an internal display. An external monitor is connected via VGA.

=== IBM 3489 ===
Does not include an internal display. An external monitor is connected via VGA.

== See also ==
- Terminal emulator
- IBM 3270
