= 3270 (disambiguation) =

3270 is an IBM computer terminal console.

3270 may also refer to:

- A.D. 3270, a year in the 4th millennium CE
- 3270 BC, a year in the 4th millennium BCE
- 3270, a number in the 3000 (number) range

== Other uses ==
- 3270 Dudley, a near-Mars asteroid, the 3270th asteroid registered
- IBM 3270, a computer terminal console
  - TN3270, terminal console standard
    - 3270 emulator, a standard for interfacing with mainframe computers
  - IBM 3270 PC (Model 5271), an IBM XT functioning as a 3270 console
  - IBM 3270 AT (Model 5273), an IBM AT functioning as a 3270 console
- Texas Farm to Market Road 3270, a state highway
