= 3R Computers =

American company

Avatar Technologies, Inc.
- Formerly: 3R Computers, Inc.; RRR Computers, Inc.
- Company type: Public
- Industry: Computers
- Founded: December 1981; 44 years ago in Westborough, Massachusetts
- Defunct: December 1992; 33 years ago
- Fate: Acquired by Digital Communications Associates

3R Computers, Inc., or RRR Computers, Inc., later Avatar Technologies, was an American computer company based in Westborough, Massachusetts, known for their Avatar series of dumb terminal-to-workstation devices.

== History ==
=== As 3R Computers (1981–1983) ===
3R Computers was founded in Westborough, Massachusetts, in December 1981 by Edward G. Grace, Brad Hebert (born 1944), and Fred Schlaffer. All three had previously worked for the Data General Corporation, a large minicomputer manufacturer whose headquarters were in the same city. Grace was named chief executive officer and president, while Hebert and Schlaffer both shared vice president status. The company spent a year in research and development before releasing the company's first product, the Avatar Terminal Converter (TC1), in late 1982. Grace cited dissatisfaction with Data General's reduction in complex projects amid the recession of the early 1980s as his reason for quitting: "Some companies are cutting back on [research and development], and frustrated engineers unable to work on their pet projects start looking around. ... It is not the money so much as the personal reward and the chance to work with the latest technology."

The company's flagship line, the Avatar Terminal Converter family, comprised devices that are in essence full-fledged microcomputers equipped with special versions of operating systems that convert the extended ASCII output of programs developed for those OSes (including terminal emulators) into the protocol supported by various dumb terminals in real time. This allowed inexpensive dumb terminals to either be used as standalone desktop computers, as intelligent terminals able to talk to a host minicomputer or mainframe, or as both. The first in line, the TC1, was released in October 1982; it ran off a Zilog Z80A and came with CP/M 2.2. It was equipped with one or two 5.25-inch floppy disk drives. In July 1983, 3R introduced the TC100 and TC3278, which paired the sole Z80A microprocessor with an Intel 8088-2 clocked at 8 MHz and features 128 KB of RAM stock (expandable to 256 KB) and one or two floppy drives. The TC100 is compatible with simple ASCII local and remote terminals while the TC3278 is specifically meant to be used with the IBM's 3270 glass terminal. In September 1983, the company released the Avatar PA1000, a protocol converter that hooked up to terminals and IBM PCs and compatibles to allow them to communicate with the newest IBM mainframes of the day.

=== As Avatar Technologies (1983–1992) ===
In developing these products 3R incurred a significant amount of debt by the summer of 1983. In September that year, the company was granted $2.3 million in a private placement of stock by six investors in order to alleviate debts and raise working capital. By January 1984, the company had changed its name to Avatar Technologies, Inc., and moved its headquarters to Hopkinton, Massachusetts. In March 1985, Avatar Technologies was acquired by Orange Nassau Electronics, the Arizona-based branch of the Hague-based Orange Nassau Group. With this acquisition Orange Nassau hoped to expand their dealer network in the United States and their portfolio of computer-related products. Hebert left the company following the acquisition; he went on to work for Wall Data in Seattle, Washington. Avatar under the auspices of Orange Nassau, meanwhile, began developing products for Apple Computer's original Macintosh line, allowing them to communicate with IBM mainframes. Between March 1987 and January 1988, Avatar released the Mac Mainframe SE and Mac Mainframe II, 3270 emulation hardware and software packages that lets the Macintosh SE and II, respectively, communicate with IBM mainframes.

By the 1990s, Avatar had opened up a facility in Santa Clara, California. In December 1992, the company was acquired by Digital Communications Associates (DCA) of Alpharetta, Georgia, for US$8 million. ACE decided to shutter both its Hopkinton and Santa Clara plants.

== See also ==
- Technical Analysis Corporation, makers of the Irma board, brand of interface expansion cards for the PC and Macintosh allowing 3270 emulation on both platforms; also acquired by DCA
