= Pritt (surname) =

Pritt is a surname. Notable persons with the name include:

- Charlotte Pritt (born 1949), American politician
- Denis Pritt (1877–1972), British politician
- Emily Pritt, American athlete
- Frank Pritt (1940–2015), American businessman
- Julia Pritt (1932–2010), American philanthropist
- Walbanke Ashby Pritt (1897–1928), British military aviator

The name may also refer to:

- Pritt (artist), British singer-songwriter
