= Green Lightning =

Green Lightning may refer to:

- Green Lightning (sculpture), a sculpture by artist Billie Lawless, built in Buffalo, New York
- Green Lightning (computing), a problem with IBM 3278-9 computer terminals which evolved into a deliberate feature
- a Flash DC Comics character
