= Keycode =

The code that is used for mapping of the keyboard scan matrix into the different physical layout keycap location.

Keycode is different from scancode, the sequence of data generated when pressing or releasing a key on a computer keyboard, however, in legacy documents it may still refer to scancode.

Keycode or may refer to:

- Keykode, an Eastman Kodak's a bar coding placed at regular intervals on negative films
- Keycode, for a lock
