= Digital Communications Associates =

American company

Digital Communication Associates, Inc.
- Company type: Public
- Industry: Computer; Telecommunications
- Founder: John Alderman
- Fate: Acquired by Attachmate
- Headquarters: Alpharetta, Georgia, United States
- Products: Computer networking hardware

Digital Communication Associates, Inc. (DCA), was a company in the computer and telecommunications industry, located in Alpharetta, Georgia, United States.

== Overview ==
Digital Communications Associates was founded by John Alderman, who led the company until 1981, when he was replaced by Bertil Nordin. In February 1983, DCA went public, raising 24 million USD. Later, Garry Betty (1957-2007) was CEO of DCA, until he left for Earthlink in November 1996.

Together with Intel, DCA had designed the DCA/Intel Communicating Applications Specification (CAS). It defines a standard, high-level programming interface for data communications applications. The DCX format is the standard file format for storing FAX images in CAS. DCA was in the market of producing T-1 multiplexers. In 1995, DCA of Alpharetta, Georgia, was acquired by Attachmate of Bellevue, Washington.

== Acquisitions ==
In 1981, under the leadership of Bertil Nordin, DCA acquired Technical Analysis Corporation (TAC), the makers of the IRMA Board which enabled PCs to function as 3270 terminals to an IBM mainframe host.

In September 1986, DCA bought Cohesive Networks.

In 1986, DCA acquired Microstuf, makers of the Crosstalk Communications package together with their flagship product, the terminal emulation program Crosstalk Mk.4.

In 1991, DCA acquired Cincinnati-based InterComputer Communications Corporation (ICC), makers of the INFOConnect line of terminal emulation and file-transfer products (focused on the Unisys ecosystem), OpenMind (collaboration) and RLN (remote lan node)

In 1992, DCA acquired Westborough-based Avatar Technologies, makers of the Mac Mainframe hardware and software 3270 emulators, for $8 million.
