= Crosstalk Mk.4 =

PC telecommunications, terminal emulation, file transfer

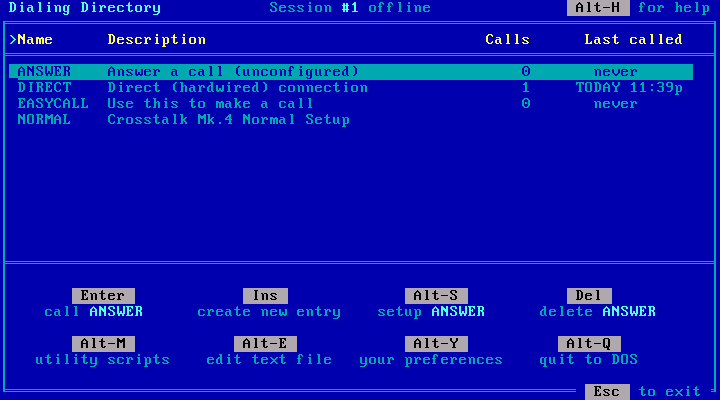
- Screenshot of Crosstalk Mk.4
- Original author: Crosstalk Communications
- Developers: Crosstalk Communications (late 1980s to 1990); Digital Communications Associates (1990 to mid 1990s)
- Release: Late 1980s
- Written in: MS-DOS
- Operating system: MS-DOS
- Available in: English
- License: Proprietary software

Crosstalk Mk.4 was a commercially available PC telecommunications and terminal emulation software package originally produced by Atlanta-based Crosstalk Communications, from the late 1980s through 1990, and by Digital Communications Associates (DCA) until the mid-1990s. Crosstalk Mk.4 was one of a suite of products produced by the company; others included the famed Crosstalk XVI, Crosstalk Communicator, Crosstalk for Windows, and Remote 2.

Its CASL scripting language, though not the program behind it, was still supported (by Micro Focus) in 2018.

== Overview ==
Featuring multisession communications capabilities, Crosstalk Mk.4 allowed multiple serial ports to be used and controlled simultaneously. A powerful programming language called CASL (Crosstalk Application Scripting Language) provided full program and communications activity control, and enabled users to create a wide variety of custom applications.

The program was in widespread use globally and served the communications and equipment control needs of major conglomerates. The company having been acquired and reacquired, as of 2018 the CASL scripting language is supported by Micro Focus's InfoConnect Desktop offering.

== History ==
".. first announced in 1985 and then reannounced in mid-1987 ... well worth the wait" was the opening to a January 1988 PC Magazine review. Actually, an earlier, functionally similar product named Crosstalk XVI, had been introduced in 1982. The XVI (16 in Roman numerals) represented the 16-bit processor of the PC; Mk.4 came somewhat later.

Digital Communications Associates acquired Microstuf, makers of the Crosstalk Communications package together with their flagship product, the Crosstalk terminal emulation program, in 1986. It was early 1987 when DCA won a look and feel lawsuit regarding Crosstalk.

Enhancements (including for Windows) continued into the early 1990s.

== Awards ==
Crosstalk Mk.4 received many accolades during its production, including PC Magazine Editors' Choice and PC World Product of the Year awards.

== See also ==
- BLAST (protocol)
- Kermit (protocol)
