= IBM Personal Computer XT =

Personal computer released in 1983

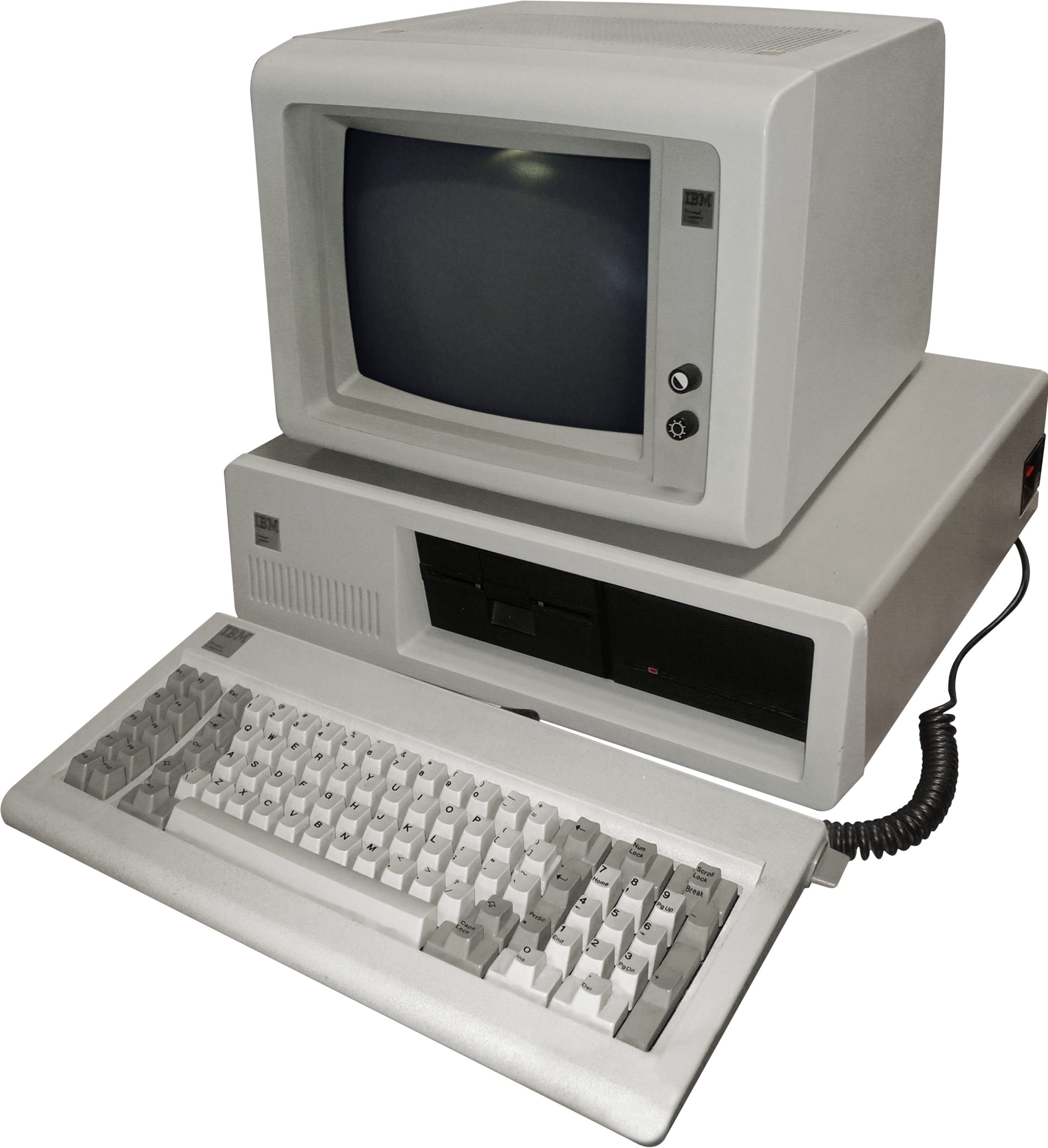
- IBM PC XT 5160 floppy drive and hard drive with 5151 Monochrome Monitor
- Also known as: IBM XT, PC/XT, XT
- Manufacturer: IBM
- Type: Personal computer
- Released: March 8, 1983; 43 years ago
- Discontinued: April 1987
- Operating system: IBM BASIC / PC DOS 2.0-3.20 / PC/IX / SCO Xenix
- CPU: Intel 8088 @ 4.77 MHz
- Memory: 128 KB – 640 KB
- Storage: 10–20 MB hard drive
- Graphics: MDA, CGA
- Sound: PC speaker 1-channel square-wave/1-bit digital (PWM-capable)
- Power: 120/240 VAC
- Dimensions: W: 19.5 in (50 cm); H: 5.5 in (14 cm); D: 16 in (41 cm)
- Weight: 32 lb (15 kg)
- Predecessor: IBM Personal Computer
- Successor: IBM Personal Computer AT (next model); IBM PS/2 Model 30 (direct replacement)
- Related: List of IBM Personal Computer models

The IBM Personal Computer XT (model 5160, often shortened to PC/XT) is the second computer in the IBM Personal Computer line, released on March 8, 1983. Except for the addition of a built-in hard drive and extra expansion slots, it is very similar to the original IBM PC model 5150 from 1981.

IBM did not specify an expanded form of "XT" on the machine, press releases, brochures or documentation, but some publications expanded the term as "eXtended Technology" or just "eXTended".

== Features ==
The XT was regarded as an incremental improvement over the IBM PC and a disappointment compared to the next-generation successor that some had anticipated. Compared to the original IBM PC, the XT has the following major differences:

- The number of expansion slots was increased from five to eight
- Base RAM was increased to at least 128 KB
- 5x8 KB ROM ICs was replaced by 2x32 KB one
- A 10 MB hard drive was included on most sub-models, with a disk controller featuring Xebec ICs
- PC DOS 2.0 was included
- The 5-pin DIN for the cassette interface was removed

Otherwise the specifications are identical to the original PC.

=== Expansion slots ===
The number of expansion slots in the original IBM PC was a limiting factor for the product, since essential components (such as the video controller, disk controller and printer interface) each came as separate expansion cards and could quickly fill up all five available slots, requiring the user to swap cards in and out as tasks demanded. Some PC clones addressed this problem by integrating components into the motherboard to free up slots, while peripheral manufacturers produced products which integrated multiple functions into one card.

The XT addressed the problem by adding three extra expansion slots for a total of eight. While the slots themselves are identical to those in the original PC, the amount of physical space in the chassis differs, so two of the new slots (located behind the hard drive) cannot accept full-length cards. In addition, the spacing of the slots is narrower than in the original PC, making it impossible to install some multi-board cards.

=== Expansion unit ===
The 5161 is an expansion chassis using an identical case and power supply to the XT, but instead of a system board, provides a backplane with eight card slots. It connects to the main system unit using an Extender Card in the system unit and a Receiver Card in the Expansion Unit, connected by a custom cable. The 5161 shipped with a 10 MB hard drive, and had room for a second one.

The Expansion Unit can also contain extra memory, but the Extender card inserts wait states for memory in the Expansion Unit, so it may be preferable to install memory into the main system unit.

The 5161 can be connected to either an XT or to the earlier 5150 (the original IBM PC).

=== Other features ===
PC DOS 2.0 offers a 9-sector floppy disk format, providing 180K/360K (single- vs. dual-sided) capacity per disk, compared to the 160K/320K provided by the 8-sector format of previous releases.

The XT was not offered in a floppy-only model for its first two years on the market, although the standard ribbon cable with two floppy connectors was still included. At that time, in order to get a second floppy drive, the user had to purchase the 5161 expansion chassis.

Like the original PC, the XT came with IBM BASIC in ROM. The XT BIOS also displays a memory count during the POST, unlike the original PC.

The XT has a desktop case similar to that of the IBM PC. It weighs 32 pounds (15 kg) and is approximately 19.5 inches (50 cm) wide by 16 inches (41 cm) deep by 5.5 inches (14 cm) high.

Similarly to the original IBM PC, the XT main board included a socket for the Intel 8087 floating point arithmetic coprocessor. This optional chip, when installed, greatly accelerated arithmetic for such applications as computer aided design or other software that required large amounts of arithmetical calculations. Only software that was especially written to take advantage of the coprocessor would show a significant speedup.

The power supply is 130 watts, an upgrade from the original PC. Those sold in the US were configured for 120 V AC only and could not be used with 240 V mains supplies. XTs with 240 V-compatible power supplies were later sold in international markets. Both were rated at 130 watts.

== Revisions and variants ==
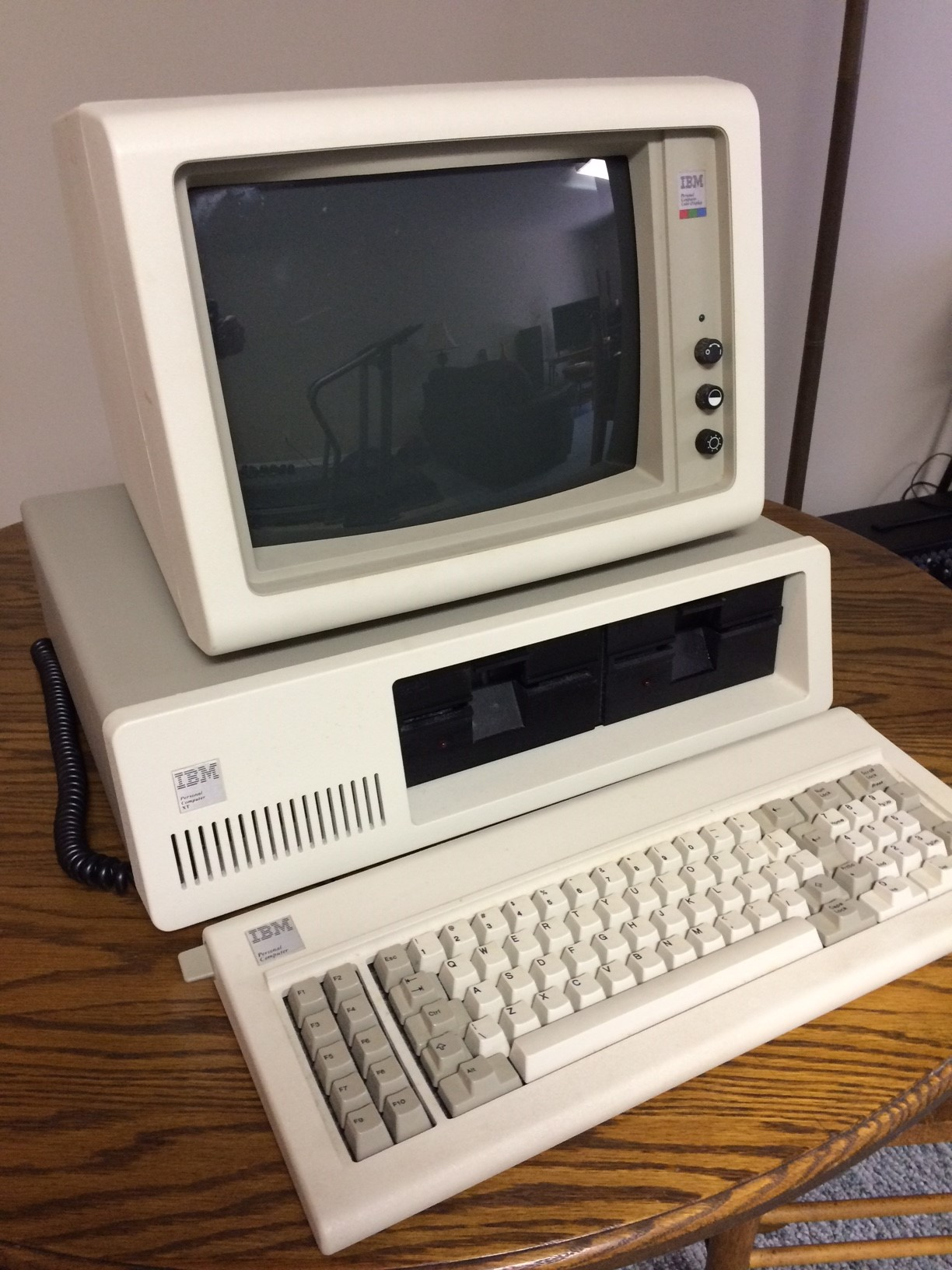
IBM PC XT 5160 dual floppy drives with 5153 Color Monitor

IBM made several submodels of the XT.

The 3270 PC, a variant of the XT featuring 3270 terminal emulation, was released in October 1983.

Submodel 068 and 078, released in 1985, offered dual-floppy configurations without a hard drive as well, and the new Enhanced Graphics Adapter and Professional Graphics Adapter became available as video card options. Retailers often sold such models with less expensive, non-IBM hard disks. By mid-1986 IBM sold hard disks with only 20% of XTs.

In 1986, the 256–640 KB motherboard models were launched, which switched to half-height drives.

Submodels 268, 278 and 089 came with 101-key keyboards (essentially the IBM Model M, but in a modified variant that used the XT's keyboard protocol and lacked LEDs).

Submodels 267, 277 and 088 had the original keyboard, but 3.5" floppy drives became available and 20MB Seagate ST-225 hard disks in 5.25" half-height size replaced the full-height 10 MB drives.

Submodel 788 was the only XT sold with the Color Graphics Adapter as a standard feature.

Submodels 568, 588, and 589 were used as basis for the XT/370; they had an additional (co-)processor board that could execute System/370 instructions. An XT-based machine with a Series/1 co-processor board existed as well, but it had its own System Unit number, the IBM 4950.

=== XT 286 ===
XT 286 badge

In 1986, the XT 286 (model 5162) was released with a 6 MHz Intel 80286 processor. Despite being marketed as a lower-tier model than the IBM AT, this system runs many applications faster than the ATs of the time with 6 MHz 286 processors, since it has zero-wait state RAM.

It shipped with 640 KB RAM standard, an AT-style 1.2 MB high-density diskette drive and a 20 MB hard disk. Despite these features, reviews rated it as a poor market value.

The XT 286 uses a 157-watt power supply, which can internally switch between 115 or 230 V AC operation.

Both the original XT and the XT/286 was discontinued in late 1987 after the launch of the IBM Personal System/2 (PS/2) line. The 8086-powered IBM PS/2 Model 30 served as the direct replacement for the XT in that PS/2 line. Unlike higher-end entries in the PS/2 line, which feature the Micro Channel expansion bus, the Model 30 contains 8-bit ISA bus slots, exactly like the XT.

=== Comparison table ===
IBM Personal Computer XT models
Type	IBM P/N	Date announced	Date withdrawn	Bus	No. of slots	No. of bays	Processor	Clock speed (MHz)	Stock onboard RAM (KB)	Maximum onboard RAM (KB)	FDD	HDD	Notes	Ref(s).
XT	5160–087	March 1983	June 1984	ISA, 8-bit	8	2	Intel 8088	4.77	128 KB	640 KB	360 KB	10 MB		
XT	5160–086	June 1984	June 1987	ISA, 8-bit	8	2	Intel 8088	4.77	256 KB	640 KB	360 KB	10 MB		
XT	5160–068	April 1985	June 1987	ISA, 8-bit	8	2	Intel 8088	4.77	256 KB	640 KB	360 KB	none		
XT	5160–078	April 1985	June 1987	ISA, 8-bit	8	2	Intel 8088	4.77	256 KB	640 KB	two 360 KB	none		
XT	5160–088	April 1986	June 1987	ISA, 8-bit	8	2	Intel 8088	4.77	512 KB	640 KB	360 KB	20 MB	Shipped with original IBM PC "Model F" keyboard	
XT	5160–089	April 1986	June 1987	ISA, 8-bit	8	2	Intel 8088	4.77	512 KB	640 KB	360 KB	20 MB	Shipped with Enhanced Keyboard	
XT	5160–267	April 1986	June 1987	ISA, 8-bit	8	2	Intel 8088	4.77	256 KB	640 KB	360 KB	none	Shipped with original IBM PC "Model F" keyboard	
XT	5160–268	April 1986	June 1987	ISA, 8-bit	8	2	Intel 8088	4.77	256 KB	640 KB	360 KB	none	Shipped with Enhanced Keyboard	
XT	5160–277	April 1986	June 1987	ISA, 8-bit	8	2	Intel 8088	4.77	256 KB	640 KB	two 360 KB	none	Shipped with original IBM PC "Model F" keyboard	
XT	5160–278	April 1986	June 1987	ISA, 8-bit	8	2	Intel 8088	4.77	256 KB	640 KB	two 360 KB	none	Shipped with Enhanced Keyboard	
3270 PC	5271–000	Unknown	July 1987	ISA, 8-bit	8	2	Intel 8088	4.77	256 KB	640 KB	360 KB	none	Without printer adapter, fixed disk adapter, and keyboard	
3270 PC	5271–002	October 1983	July 1987	ISA, 8-bit	8	2	Intel 8088	4.77	256 KB	640 KB	360 KB	none	Without printer adapter and fixed disk adapter	
3270 PC	5271–004	October 1983	July 1987	ISA, 8-bit	8	2	Intel 8088	4.77	320 KB	640 KB	360 KB	none	Without fixed disk adapter; stock onboard RAM increased to 384 KB in June 1984	
3270 PC	5271–006	October 1983	July 1987	ISA, 8-bit	8	2	Intel 8088	4.77	320 KB	640 KB	360 KB	10 MB	With fixed disk adapter; stock onboard RAM increased to 384 KB in June 1984	
XT/370	5160–568	October 1984	April 1987	ISA, 8-bit	8	2	Intel 8088	4.77	256 KB	640 KB	360 KB	none		
XT/370	5160–588	October 1984	April 1987	ISA, 8-bit	8	2	Intel 8088	4.77	256 KB	640 KB	360 KB	10 MB		
XT/370	5160–589	October 1984	April 1987	ISA, 8-bit	8	2	Intel 8088	4.77	256 KB	640 KB	360 KB	10 MB		
XT Model 286	5162–286	September 1986	October 1987	ISA, 16-bit	8	2	Intel 80286	6	640 KB	640 KB	1.2 MB	20 MB		

== Reception ==
The XT was well received, although PC DOS 2.0 was regarded as a greater improvement than any of the hardware changes, and by the end of 1983 IBM was selling every unit they made. By 1985 the IBM PC AT made the XT obsolete for most customers.

== Timeline ==
Timeline of the IBM Personal Computer

Asterisk (*) denotes a model released in Japan only

== See also ==
- Amiga Sidecar
- PC-based IBM-compatible mainframes#Personal Computer XT/370
