= IND$FILE =

IND$FILE is a file transfer program from IBM that was first released in 1983 to allow the transfer of files between an IBM PC running the IBM 3270 emulator (PC/3270) and a VSE, MVS or VM/CMS mainframe. IND$FILE originally worked only with the SEND and RECEIVE commands of the 3270 PC emulator, but today most terminal emulators that have a 3270 mode include it.

In the UK, it is also known as IND£FILE, since in the EBCDIC code pages used in the UK the pound sign occupies the position the dollar sign takes in US codepages.

- IND$FILD Download
- IND$FILS Server

== See also ==
- 3270 emulator
- Kermit (protocol)
