= IBM 3270 PC =

Personal computer by IBM

IBM 3270 PC (System Unit 5271)
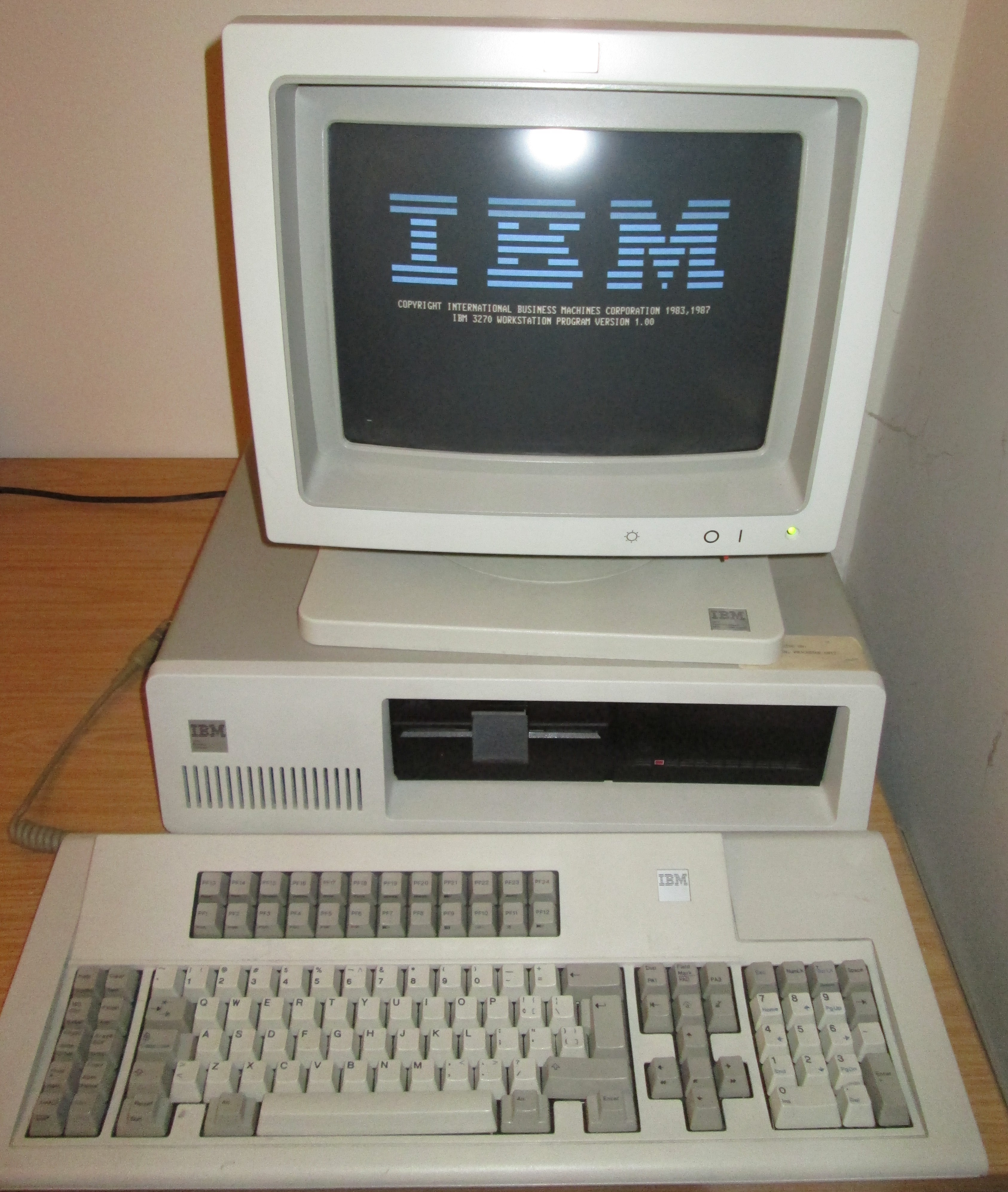
- Type: Personal computer/Terminal emulator
- Released: October 1983; 43 years ago
- Discontinued: 1987
- Operating system: 3270-PC Control Program with PC DOS 2.0 or 2.1; IBM 3270 Workstation Program with PC DOS 3.3
- CPU: Intel 8088 @ 4.77 MHz
- Memory: 256KB ~ 640KB

The IBM 3270 PC (IBM System Unit 5271), is a personal computer developed by IBM and released in October 1983. Although its hardware is mostly identical to the IBM PC XT, the 3270 contains additional components that, in combination with software, can emulate the behavior of an IBM 3270 terminal. Therefore, it can be used both as a standalone computer, and as a terminal to a mainframe.

IBM later released the 3270 AT (IBM System Unit 5273), which is a similar design based on the IBM PC AT. They also released high-end graphics versions of the 3270 PC in both XT and AT variants. The XT-based versions are called 3270 PC/G and 3270 PC/GX and they use a different System Unit 5371, while their AT counterparts (PC AT/G and PC AT/GX) have System Unit 5373.

== Technology ==
The additional hardware occupies nearly all the free expansion slots in the computer. It includes a video card which occupies 1-3 ISA slots (depending on what level of graphics support is required), and supports CGA and MDA video modes. The display resolution is 720×350, either on the matching 14-inch color monitor (model 5272) or in monochrome on an MDA monitor.

A further expansion card intercepts scancodes from the 122-key 3270 keyboard, translating them into XT scancodes which are then sent to the normal keyboard connector. This keyboard, officially called the 5271 Keyboard Element, weighs 9.3 pounds.

The final additional card (a 3278 emulator) provides the communication interface to the host mainframe.

== Models ==
- 3270 PC (System Unit 5271) - original 3270 PC, initially offered in three different Models numbered 2, 4, and 6. Model 2 has non-expandable memory of 256 KB and a single floppy drive. Model 4 has expandable memory, a second floppy drive, and a parallel port. Model 6 replaces one of the floppy drives with a 10 MB hard disk. Model 6 had a retail price of $6,210 at its launch (with 512KB RAM), not including display, cables and software; a working configuration with an additional 192KB RAM, color display (model 5272) and the basic cabling and software (but without support for host/mainframe-side graphics) ran to $8,465. A 1985 review by PC Magazine found that fast file transfer to and from the mainframe was the strong selling point of this unit: file transfers that took hours with an Irma board took only minutes with the boards (and software) that came with the 3270 PC. The 3270 PC suffered however from incompatibility problems with other XT hardware and DOS software (for example, Microsoft QuickBasic). Its 3278 mainframe board was also considered lackluster, in comparison with an IBM 3279 graphics terminal, because it provides only a 24-line display during mainframe sessions, requiring either PC-side scrolling for the 32-line applications typically used with a 3279, or explicit 24-line application support on the mainframe side.
  - later released Models 24 (two floppy drives) and 26 (floppy plus 10 MB hard-disk) supported and were bundled with the IBM 3295 Plasma Monitor. This monochrome display is intended to provide a high-capacity text terminal for simultaneous mainframe sessions. It has two sets of fonts: one with 6 × 12-pixel characters, with which it can display text in 62 rows by 160 columns, and a larger font with 9 × 16-pixel characters, with which it can display 46 rows by 106 columns of text.
  - Models 30, 50, and 70 have 640 KB RAM on the system board, and follow same disk pattern as the initial models (one floppy, two floppies, and floppy plus hard drive) but with a 20 MB hard disk. They (and all subsequent models) also revert to the 5151/5272 Display Adapter (no Plasma Monitor support).
  - Models 31, 51, and 71 revert to 256 KB RAM on the system board but were also shipped with an Expanded Memory Adapter (XMA) with 1 MB RAM standard. Optionally these models (released in 1986) could be equipped with up to 2 MB of XMA.
  - Models P30/P50/P70 and P31/P51/P71 were like Models 30/50/70 and respectively 31/51/71 but with a 101-key (AT-style) keyboard replacing the 5271 Keyboard.

Models 31/51/71 and all P-models, require version 3.0 of the Control Program.

- 3270 PC/G - 3270 PC with improved graphics hardware and mouse support; it was sold together with an IBM 5279 Color Display, which is powered by an IBM 5278 Display Attachment Unit All Points Addressable (APA) graphics card providing 720x512 resolution and CGA emulation for compatibility. At its launch, the retail price for this configuration was $11,240.
  - initially offered as Model 12, 14, and 16; these have similar disk configuration options (one floppy, two floppies, and one floppy plus on hard disk) as the basic 3270 PC, but had more standard memory at 384 KB, 512, and respectively 576 KB. Even the basic Model 12 has a parallel port and supports a mouse. The mouse (IBM 5277) is optional though even for Model 16, and had a list price of $340.
  - 3270 PC/GX - Extended APA graphics support (1024 × 1024) provided by the IBM 5378 Display Attachment Unit; shipped with a 19-inch color or monochrome monitor (IBM 5379). Price at launch was $18,490, although adding the basic software and cables ran close to $20,000.

The basic 3270 PC could not be upgraded to the PC/G or PC/GX. These two models use a different basic unit (System Unit 5371), itself priced at $6,580 (for Model 16) without graphics.

Later, AT-based models:

- 3270 AT (System Unit 5273) - corresponds to the 3270 PC, but based on an IBM AT.
- 3270 AT/G and GX (System Unit 5373) - corresponds to the 3270 PC/G and PC/GX, respectively, but based on an IBM AT.

== Software ==
At its launch, the 3270 PC used the 3270 PC Control Program as its operating system. PC DOS 2.0 (and later 2.1) can run as a task under the Control Program. Only one PC DOS task can be run at any given time, but in parallel with this, the Control Program can run up to four mainframe sessions. The Control Program also provides a basic windowing environment, with up to seven windows; besides the four mainframe and one DOS session, it also provides two notepads. The notepads can be used to copy text from the PC DOS session to the mainframe sessions but not vice versa. Given the small size of the character display, a review by PC Magazine concluded that the windowing features were hardly useful, and the notepads even less so. The Control Program was also described as a "memory hog" in this review, using about 200 KB of RAM in a typical configuration. More useful were the specialized PC DOS file transfer utilities that were available (called simply SEND and RECEIVE), which allow files to be exchanged with the mainframe and provide ASCII/EBCDIC conversion. The list prices for the Control Program and file transfer utilities were $300 and $600, respectively. At the launch of the 3270 PC, the Control Program was the distinguishing software feature between a 3270 PC and an XT with an added 3278 board.

IBM considered the 3270 PC Control Program to be mainframe software, so it did not provide user-installable upgrades. Upgrades had to be installed by expert system programmers.

The PC/G and PC/GX models run a mainframe-graphics-capable version of the Control Program called the Graphics Control Program (GCP). On the mainframe side, the IBM Graphical Data Display Manager (GDDM) release 4 (and later) is compatible with these two workstations. The GDDM provided support for local pan and zoom (without taxing the host mainframe) on the PC/G and PC/GX.

In 1987 IBM released the IBM 3270 Workstation Program, which supports both XT and AT models of the 3270 PCs, as well as the plain XT and AT models (even with an XT or AT keyboard) with a 3278 board. It allows up to six concurrent DOS 3.3 sessions, but the number of mainframe sessions and notepads remained the same (four and two, respectively).

== Reception ==
BYTE in 1984 praised the 3270 PC's 3278 emulation and color monitor, and concluded that the computer was "a must" for those seeking high-quality graphics or mainframe communications.

== See also ==
- IBM PC XT
- IBM PC AT
- Personal Computer XT/370
- Professional Graphics Controller
- 3270 emulator
