= Julia Pritt =

American philanthropist (1932–2010)

- Born: July 9, 1932; Torrance, California, U.S.
- Died: April 3, 2010 (aged 77); Seattle, Washington, U.S.
- Occupation: Philanthropist
- Known for: Cofounder of Attachmate

Julia Pritt (July 9, 1932 – April 3, 2010) was a Seattle area philanthropist and cofounder of Attachmate. She founded Julia's Place (a homeless family shelter in the Madrona neighborhood) and Washington Women in Need, and donated land for an Issaquah park. Pritt died in April, 2010.

The Julia Pritt House, a shelter for the homeless in Issaquah, was named for her.

Julia Pritt and Frank Pritt were Seattle software entrepreneurs who co-founded Attachmate in their living room in 1982. They were married for 28 years before divorcing in 1990.

Pritt was born in Torrance, California, in 1932 and died in Seattle in April 2010.
