= Frank Pritt =

Frank Wilson Pritt III (1940–2015) was a salesperson and product manager for Harris Corporation in the 1970s, then founder of Attachmate Corporation in 1982. Attachmate went on to become Washington's largest privately held software firm. He was listed on Forbes' list of 400 richest Americans in October 1995. He announced his retirement from Attachmate, where he had held the office of president, in 2005.

Frank Pritt and Julia Pritt were Seattle software entrepreneurs, and co-founded Attachmate in their living room in 1982. They were married for 28 years, divorcing in 1990.

On May 17, 2006 Frank listed his estate in Orange County for sale with a price of $75 million. The 30,000-square-foot (2,800 m^{2}) estate, located in Corona del Mar, CA, is named the Portabello Estate. The estate finally sold towards the end of 2010 for $34.1 million plus the buyer also gave the seller a property valued at around $7 million.

He died on July 28, 2015.
