= Irma board =

Early interface card for PCs and Macs

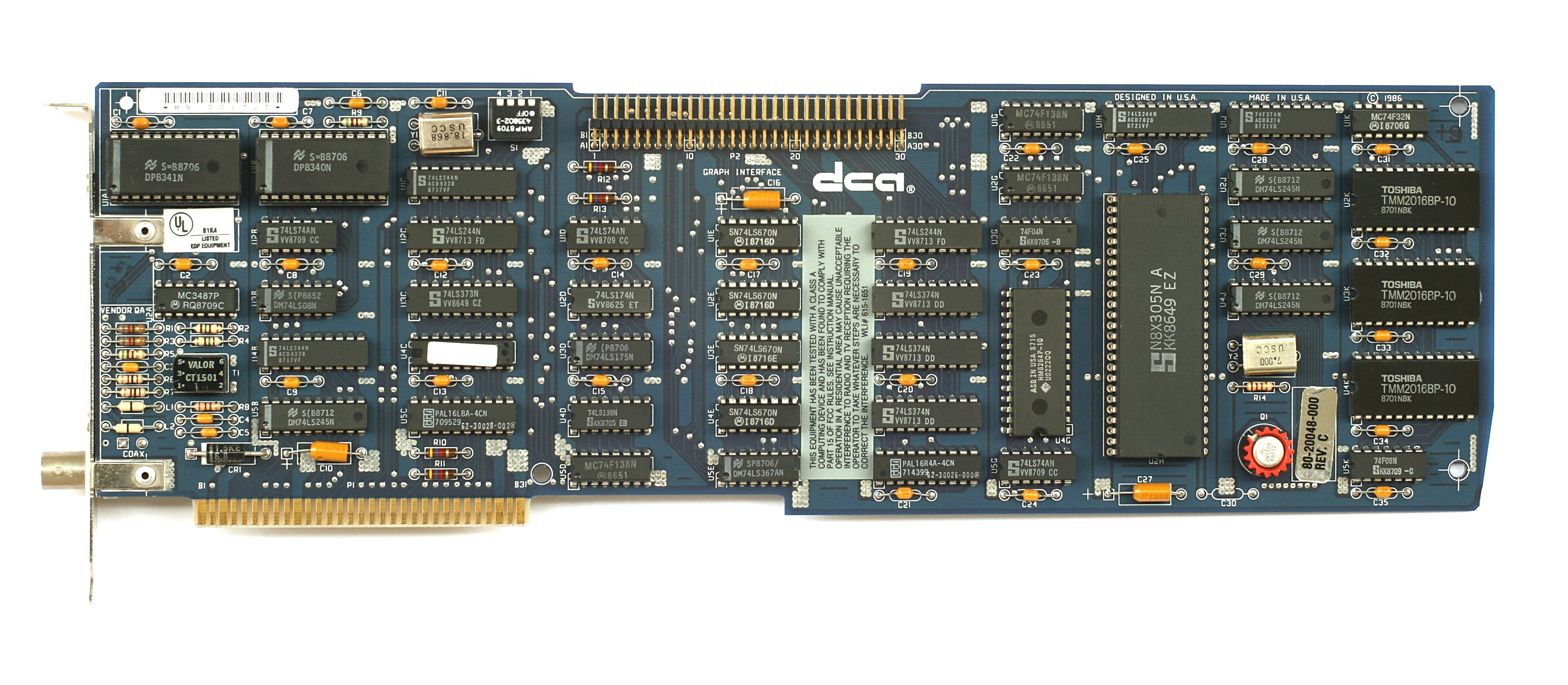
DCA Irma board for PCs (IRMA II ISA)

Irma board, originally spelled IRMA board, refers to a brand of coaxial interface cards for PCs and Macintosh computers used to enable 3270 emulator programs to connect to IBM mainframe computers. IRMA boards were used to connect PCs and Macs to IBM 3274 terminal controllers.

IRMA boards supported both Control Unit Terminal (CUT) and Distributed Function Terminal (DFT) mode, although the later required additional software; DFT mode supported multiple simultaneous mainframe sessions.

IRMA boards were invented by Technical Analysis Corp. (TAC), acquired by Digital Communications Associates, Inc. (DCA) who manufactured and marketed the Irma products from 1982 on. DCA of Alpharetta, Georgia, was acquired in 1994 by Attachmate of Bellevue, Washington.

A board with all the capabilities of that which would eventually be called IRMA was originally developed in-house by Amdahl Corp in 1977, but it was not actively marketed by Amdahl.

== See also ==
- IBM 3270 PC
- Avatar Technologies, Inc. (née 3R Computers), makers of the Mac Mainframe line of products allowing IBM 3270 emulation on the Macintosh SE and II
- Terminal emulator
