= 3270 emulator =

Terminal emulator

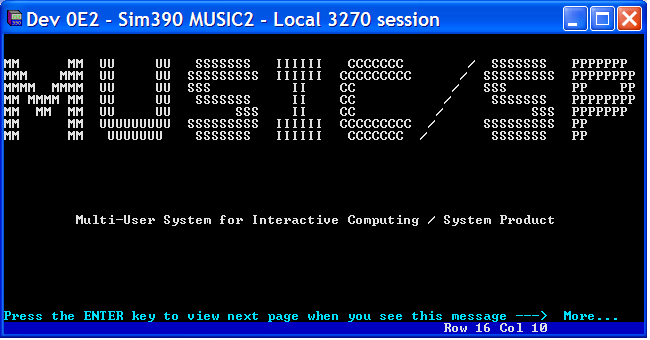
A TN3270 client running on Windows

A 3270 Emulator is a terminal emulator that duplicates the functions of an IBM 3270 mainframe computer terminal on a computer, usually a PC or similar microcomputer.

As the original 3270 series terminals were connected to the host computer through a display controller (cluster controller) (Note: The original cluster controllers could be directly attached to an I/O channel or indirectly through a synchronous communications link. Later versions also supported Token Ring and Ethernet.) using coaxial cable, emulators originally required channel (rare), coax or synchronous communication adapter cards to be installed in the PC. Today, many emulators communicate with the mainframe computer through a TN3270 server (Note: In some cases the TN3270 server is embedded in an adapter, e.g., IBM OSA-ICC, and the emulated 3270 terminals appear to be on a channel attached cluster controller.) using the TN3270 (RFC 1576) variant of the Telnet (RFC 495) protocol common on TCP/IP networks including the Internet, so special hardware is no longer required on machines with Internet access. Several vendors offered both coax and communications attached 3270 emulators and TN3270 clients as part of the same product.

== Connectivity ==
One way of categorizing a 3270 simulator is by how it connects to the host.

Some 3270 simulators use a channel adapter to connect directly to the host. This is common in protocol converters or other situations where performance justifies the higher cost.

Some 3270 simulators use a coax adapter such as the Irma board to connect to a cluster controller.

Some 3270 simulators use a synchronous serial link to connect to a communications controller. Using BSC requires less code, but SDLC with SNA allows more functionality.

Some 3270 simulators use a LAN interface to a cluster controller.

Contemporary 3270 simulators typically use TN3270 to connect to a TN3270 server on the host.

== Products ==
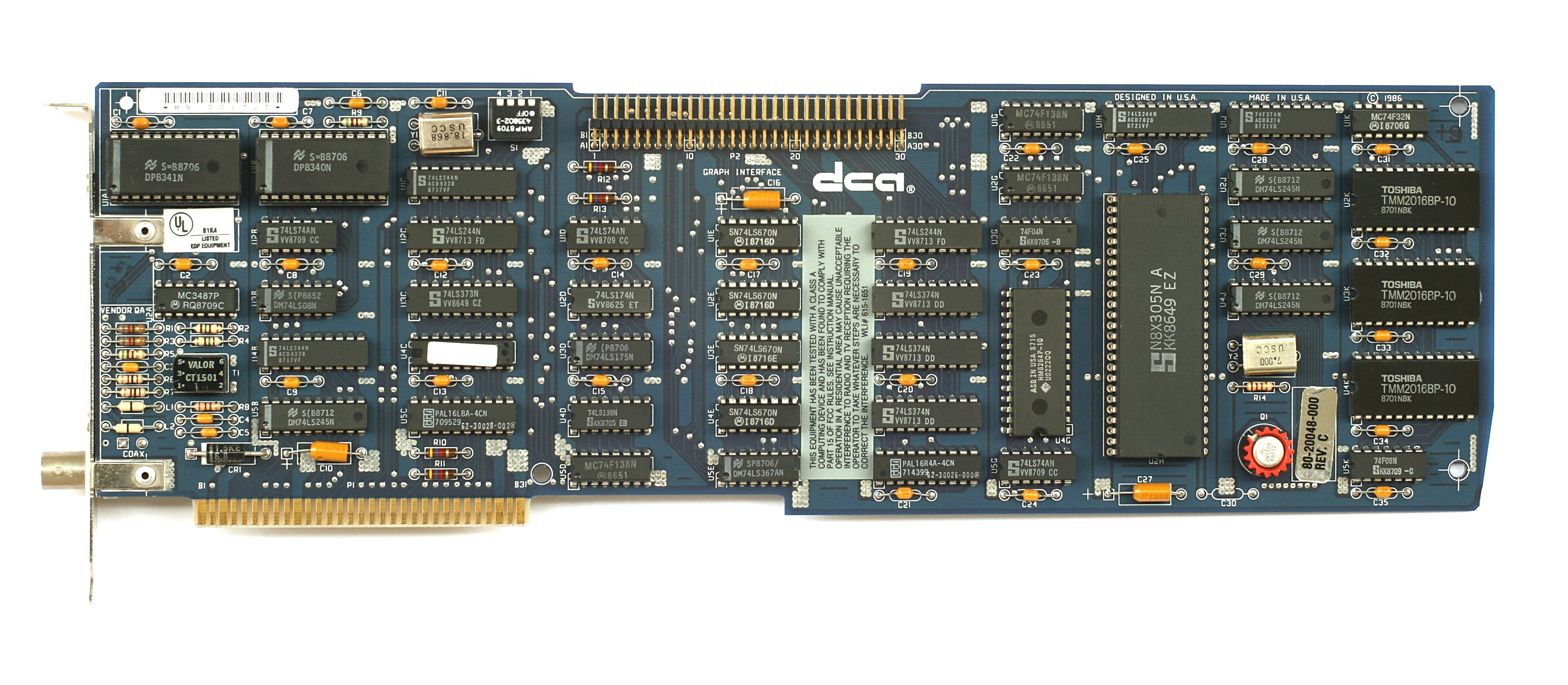
DCA IRMA II ISA for PCs.

In 1983, IBM marketed the IBM 3270 PC, a bundled package including a PC, a graphics adapter, 3270 emulation software and coax interface card. 3270 emulators and TN3270 clients are also available from many third-party vendors like Attachmate and Ericom. Some solutions permitted a coax interface to be shared by workstations in a LAN.

== See also ==
- Irma board
- Terminal emulator
- Systems Network Architecture (SNA)
- Synchronous Data Link Control (SDLC)
- TN3270
- TN3270 Plus
- IND$FILE
