= Graphical Data Display Manager =

GDDM (Graphical Data Display Manager) is a computer graphics system for the IBM System/370 which was developed in IBM's Hursley lab, and first released in 1979. GDDM was originally designed to provide programming support for the IBM 3279 colour display terminal and the associated 3287 colour printer. The 3279 was a colour graphics terminal designed to be used in a general business environment.

GDDM was extended in the early 1980s to provide graphics support for all of IBM's display terminals and printers, and ran on all of IBM's mainframe operating systems.

GDDM also provided support for the (then current) international standards for interactive computer graphics: GKS and PHIGS. Both GKS and PHIGS were designed around the requirements of CAD systems.

GDDM is also available on the IBM i midrange operating system, as well as its predecessor, the AS/400.

GDDM comprises a number of components:

- Graphics primitives - lines, circles, boxes etc.
- Graphing - through the Presentation Graphics Feature (PGF)
- Language support - PL/I, REXX, COBOL etc.
- Conversion capabilities - for example to GIF format.
- Interactive Chart Utility (ICU).

GDDM remains in widespread use today, embedded in many z/OS applications, as well as in system programs.

== GDDM and OS/2 Presentation Manager ==
IBM and Microsoft began collaborating on the design of OS/2 in 1986. The Graphics Presentation Interface (GPI), the graphics API in the OS/2 Presentation Manager, was based on IBM's GDDM and the Graphics Control Program (GCP). GCP was originally developed in Hursley for the 3270/PC-G and 3270/PC-GX terminals.

The GPI was the primary graphics API for the OS/2 operating system.

At the time (1980s), the graphical user interface (GUI) was still in its early stages of popularity, but already it was clear that the foundation of a good GUI was a graphics API with strong real-time interactive capabilities. Unfortunately, the design of GDDM was closer to (at the time) traditional graphics APIs like GKS, which made it unsuited for more than the simplest interactive uses.

Microsoft and IBM went their separate ways in 1991. Microsoft continued development of its Windows operating environment with Graphics Device Interface (GDI) graphics API. IBM continued with OS/2 for several more years.
