= Attachmate =

Defunct software company

Coordinates: 47.632639°N 122.342168°W

Attachmate Corporation
- Type: Private
- Industry: Computer software; Technology services
- Founded: 1982; 44 years ago, in Bellevue, Washington, United States
- Fate: Acquired by The Attachmate Group (April 18, 2005)
- Headquarters: Seattle, Washington, United States
- Area served: Worldwide
- Products: Terminal emulator software; Interoperability software; Security software
- Revenue: US$400 million
- Parent: OpenText
- Website: www.attachmate.com

Attachmate Corporation was a software company founded in 1982 which focused on secure terminal emulation, legacy integration, and managed file transfer software. Citrix-compatibility and Attachment Reflection were enhanced/added offerings.

== History and products ==
=== Attachmate Corporation ===
Older logo, as of 1988

Attachmate was founded in 1982 by Frank W. Pritt. It focused initially on the IBM terminal emulation market, and became a major technology employer in the Seattle area.

=== KeaTerm ===
KEAsystems' KEAterm products were PC software packages that emulated some of Digital Equipment Corporation's VT terminals, and facilitated integrating Windows-based PCs with multiple host applications. These included KEAterm VT340 and VT420 terminal emulators, and KEA X X terminal software).

KEA was acquired by Attachmate.

=== DCA IRMA ===
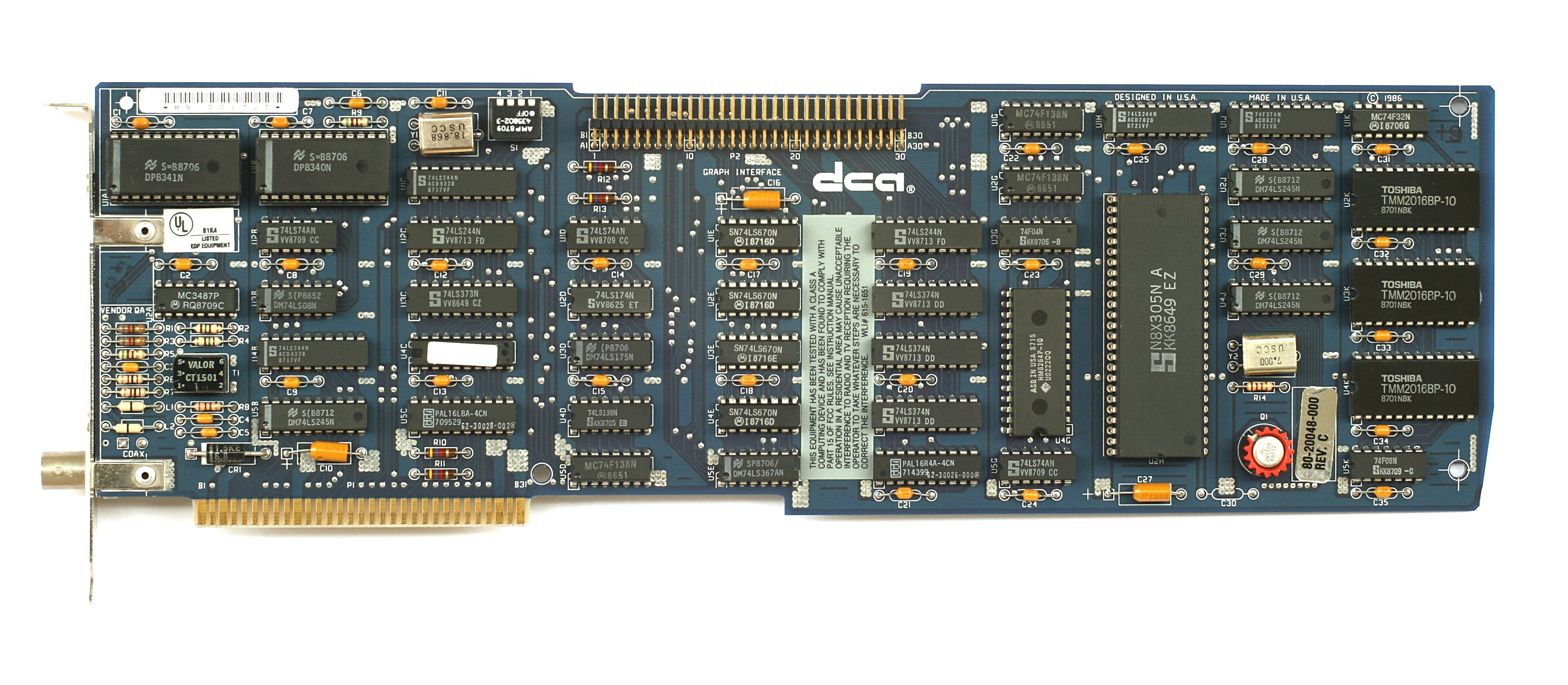
DCA IRMA II ISA network card

Another acquisition was Digital Communications Associates (DCA), makers of IRMA line of terminal emulators, INFOconnect, Crosstalk communications software, and OpenMind collaborative software). DCA was also known for its 3270 IRMA hardware product (used for SDLC), and ISCA SDLC hardware adapters. They also supported driver downloads.

=== Extra! ===
The Attachmate Extra! family of terminal emulator packages was built to include 3270, 5250 and VT100.

== Acquisition ==
After buying both WRQ, Inc. and Attachmate, who had been long-time competitors in the host emulation business, a group of private equity firms announced in 2005 that the companies would be merged under the new ownership. It was announced that Attachmate founder and CEO Frank Pritt would retire at the same time.
