= Antonopoulos =

Antonopoulos (Greek: Αντωνόπουλος) is a Greek surname with the female version being Antonopoulou (Αντωνοπούλου). The name is derived from the root name Antonius. Among others, it is the surname of:

- Anastasios Antonopoulos (1893–???), Greek wrestler
- Andreas Antonopoulos (born 1972), Greek British bitcoin advocate and security expert
- Antonios Antonopoulos (1805–1887), Greek politician
- Apostolos Antonopoulos (born 1983), Greek swimmer
- Constantinos Antonopoulos, Greek businessman
- Filonas Antonopoulos, Greek footballer (AEK Athens F.C. president)
- Ioannis Antonopoulos (1810–1882), Greek politician
- Seven Antonopoulos (born 1974), American rock drummer
