= Mandy Chessell =

British computer scientist

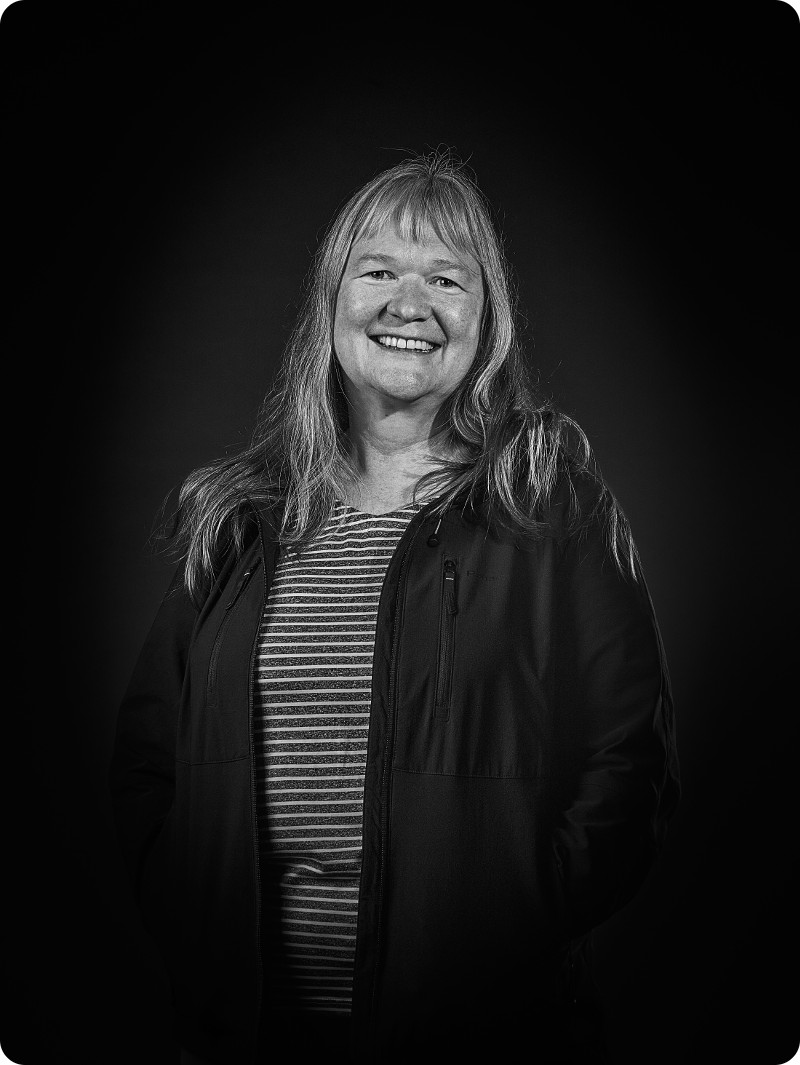
- Born: ca 1965; Bath, England
- Citizenship: British
- Known for: software inventions, innovation, model-driven software development tools, information management, design patterns
- Awards: Silver Medal Royal Academy of Engineering, BCS Karen Burt Prize, FREng, Female Inventor, Best Woman in Corporate Sector (2006 Blackberry Women and Technology Awards), Innovator of the Year (2012 Cisco Everywoman in Technology), Doctorate of Science (Plymouth University)
- Scientific career
- Fields: Computer Science, Software Engineering
- Workplaces: IBM

Notes
- BSc, MSc, FREng, CEng, FBCS, HonFIED, Distinguished Engineer, Master Inventor, Member of the IBM Academy of Technology, CBE

Amanda Elizabeth Chessell is a British computer scientist and a Distinguished Engineer at IBM. She has been awarded the title of IBM Master Inventor. She is also a Member of the IBM Academy of Technology.

Outside IBM, Chessell is the first woman to be awarded the Silver Medal of the Royal Academy of Engineering. In 2002 she was elected a Fellow of the Royal Academy of Engineering.

Chessell is a visiting professor at the University of Sheffield and at the Surrey Centre for the Digital Economy (CoDE) at the University of Surrey.

== Education ==
Chessell studied Computer Science and has both an O-Level and an A-Level in the subject. She studied at Plymouth Polytechnic up to 1987 and obtained a Bachelors Honors Degree in Computing with Informatics.

Subsequently, Chessell joined IBM in 1987 at Hursley Park, Winchester where she studied for a master's degree in software engineering at the University of Brighton which was completed in 1997. Her studies at Brighton were sponsored by IBM.

== Career at IBM ==
Chessell joined IBM in 1987, and is based at IBM's Hursley laboratory located near Winchester in Hampshire, UK.

Chessell's early work focused on distributed transaction processing, adding features to products such as CICS, Encina, Component Broker and WebSphere Application Server. Additionally she worked on event management, business process modelling and outside-in design (OID).

Later, Chessell focused on developing model-driven tools to simplify the analysis and design of large systems and to automate their development. This work covers the development of user interfaces, services, information integration technology in the field of Master Data Management.

Chessell's later work focused on data lake architectures, metadata management and information governance. She is the Chair of the ODPi Technical Steering Committee (TSC) and leader of the ODPi Egeria Project

Chessell frequently lectures on topics related to Computer Science and innovation. Such lectures take place at universities such as Queen Mary University of London.

Chessell was one of the 30 women identified in the BCS Women in IT Campaign in 2014, who were then featured in the e-book "Women in IT: Inspiring the next generation" produced by the BCS, The Chartered Institute for IT.

== Achievements ==
In 2000, she was among the first group of MIT Technology Review magazine's TR100.

In 2001, she won the Royal Academy of Engineering Silver Medal for the invention and engineering of Reusable Software Component Architecture.

In 2002, she was elected a Fellow of The Royal Academy of Engineering.

In 2004, Chessell won the British Computer Society nomination for the Women's Engineering Society "Karen Burt" award.

In 2006, Chessell won a Female Inventor of the Year Award for building capacity for innovation.

Also in 2006, Chessell was awarded a prize for the Best Woman in the Corporate Sector at the Blackberry Women in Technology awards.

In 2011, Chessell was made an honorary fellow of the Institution of Engineering Designers (IED).

In 2012, Chessell received Innovator of the Year at the Cisco everywoman in Technology Awards.

In 2013, Chessell received an Honorary Doctor of Science from Plymouth University.

In 2015, Chessell received an Honorary Doctorate of Technology from University of Brighton.

She was appointed Commander of the Order of the British Empire (CBE) in the 2015 New Year Honours for services to engineering.

In 2016, Chessell was named in the Top 50 Influential Women in Engineering List 2016 and received an Honorary Doctorate of Technology from University of South Wales

In 2017, Chessell received an Honorary Doctor of Science from University of Bath.

== Publications ==
- 2020: CDEI and BCS study into ethical maturity of AI practice by Mandy Chessell
- 2019: AI is not magic but it is complex by Mandy Chessell
- 2018: The Journey Continues: From Data Lake to Data-Driven Organization by Mandy Chessell, Ferd Scheepers, Maryna Strelchuk, Ron van der Starre, Seth Dobrin, Daniel Hernandez
- 2017: The case for open metadata by Mandy Chessell
- 2016: InsightOut: The case for open metadata and governance by Mandy Chessell
- 2016: InsightOut: The role of Apache Atlas in the open metadata ecosystem by Mandy Chessell
- 2015: Building a data reservoir to use big data with confidence by Mandy Chessell
- 2015: Common Information Models for an Open, Agile and Analytical World by Mandy Chessell, Gandhi Sivakumar, Dan Wolfson, Kerard Hogg, Ray Harishankar
- 2015: Designing and operating a data reservoir by Mandy Chessell, Jay Limburn, Kevin Shank, Nigel Jones, David Radley
- 2014: Governing and Managing Big Data for Analytics and Decision Makers by Mandy Chessell, Ferd Scheepers, Nhan Nguyen, Ruud van Kessel, Ron van der Starre
- 2014: Ethics for big data and analytics by Mandy Chessell
- 2013: Design Patterns for Information in a Service-Oriented Architecture by Mandy Chessell and Harald C Smith
- 2013: Patterns of Information Management by Mandy Chessell and Harald C Smith
- 2013: Smarter Analytics: Information Architecture for a New Era of Computing by Mandy Chessell
- 2013: Smarter Analytics: Taking the Journey to IBM Cognitive Systems Redguide by Mandy Chessell, Eric Jenney, Scott Gerard, Bill Rapp
- 2012: Smarter Analytics: Driving Customer Interactions with the IBM Next Best Action Solution by Mandy Chessell and David Pugh
- 2008: Modeling Demystified: Part 1, "Creating a system specification from the user's point of view" by Mandy Chessell and Larry Yusuf
- 2008: Modeling Demystified: Part 2, "Building a user model" by Mandy Chessell and Larry Yusuf
- 2008: Modeling Demystified: Part 3, "Extend UML for user models" by Mandy Chessell and Larry Yusuf
- 2006: SOA User Roles by Mandy Chessell and Birgit Schmidt-Wesche
- 2005: Patterns: Model-Driven Development Using IBM Rational Software Architect by Peter Swithinbank, Mandy Chessell, Tracy Gardner, Catherine Griffin, Jessica Man, Helen Wylie and Larry Yusuf
- 2005: Implement model-driven development to increase the business value of your IT system by Mandy Chessell, Larry Yusuf and Tracy Gardner
- 2000: Transactional Business Process Servers: Definition and Requirements by Thomas Mikalsen, Isabelle Rouvellou, Stanley Sutton Jr., and Stefan Tai, IBM T.J. Watson Research Center and Mandy Chessell, Catherine Griffin, and David Vines, IBM United Kingdom Laboratories

== Lectures ==
- Exploring the Social and Ethical Issues in Data Linkage by Mandy Chessell, July 2015
- A history of Computing through IBM's eyes by Mandy Chessell, November 2011
- Information for a smarter city by Mandy Chessell, May 2011
- Innovative Organizations by Mandy Chessell, February 2010
- Model driven development: a WES Lecture by Mandy Chessell, June 2008
- Innovation Ecosystems: An IBM Academy of Technology study by Mandy Chessell, May 2008
- Engineering IT systems for the people who use them by Mandy Chessell, November 2006
- Company Case study 2 – Product Innovation by Mandy Chessell, October 2004
