= Alfred Spector =

American computer scientist and research manager

Alfred Z. Spector
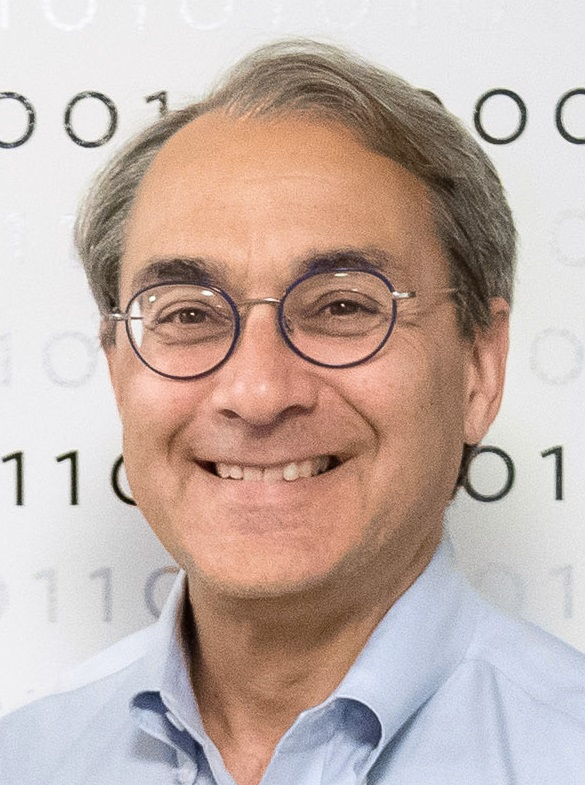
- Born: October 14, 1954
- Education: Harvard University; Stanford University
- Known for: Opportunities and Perils in Data Science; Google's Hybrid Approach to Research; CS+X; Research on Reliable Distributed Computing; Andrew File System (AFS)
- Awards: ΦΒΚ Scholar (2018-19); ACM Software Systems Award (2016); American Academy of Arts and Sciences (2009); National Academy of Engineering (2004); IEEE Kanai Award for Distributed Computing (2001); Hertz Fellow (1977)
- Scientific career
- Workplaces: MIT; Two Sigma Investments; Google; IBM; Transarc Corporation; Carnegie Mellon University
- Thesis: Multiprocessing Architectures for Local Area Networks (1981)
- Website: www.azs-services.com

Alfred Zalmon Spector (born October 14, 1954) is an American computer scientist and research manager. He is a Professor of Practice in the MIT EECS Department and was previously CTO of Two Sigma Investments. Before that, he was Vice President of Research and Special Initiatives at Google.

== Education ==
Spector received his Bachelor of Arts degree in Applied Mathematics from Harvard University, and his PhD in computer science from Stanford University in 1981. His research explored communication architectures for building multiprocessors out of network-linked computers and included measurements of remote procedure call operations on experimental Ethernet. His dissertation was titled Multiprocessing Architectures for Local Computer Networks, and his advisor was Forest Baskett III.

== Career ==
Spector was an associate professor of computer science at Carnegie Mellon University (CMU). While there, he served as doctoral advisor to Randy Pausch, Jeff Eppinger and Joshua Bloch and seven others. Spector was a founder of Transarc Corporation in 1989 which built and sold distributed transaction processing and wide area file systems software, commercializing the Andrew File System developed at CMU. After Transarc was acquired by IBM, he became a software executive and then vice president of global software and services research for IBM and finally vice president of strategy and technology within IBM's Software Group.

Spector joined Google as vice president of research in November 2007 and retired in early 2015. In October 2015 he was hired by technology-driven hedge fund Two Sigma Investments to serve as the CTO, which he did until mid-2020.

== Advisory committees ==
Spector is involved with academic computer science and has served on numerous advisory committees, including chairing the NSF CISE Advisory Committee from 2004–2005; various university advisory committees including at City College of New York, Carnegie Mellon University, Harvard, Rice University and Stanford. He has served on the National Academy Computer Science and Telecommunication Board from 2006 to 2013 and chaired the Computer Science and Engineering Section of the National Academy of Engineering.

== Speaking/writing ==
Spector has written and spoken on diverse topics related to computer science and engineering. In 2004, he described the expanding sphere of Computer Science and proposed the need to infuse computer science into all disciplines using the phrase CS+X. He and his co-authors Peter Norvig and Slav Petrov proposed a model for computer science research in industry, based on their experience at Google in their paper, Google’s Hybrid Approach to Research. Since 2016 Spector advocated for a balanced and critical perspective on data science, and in the presentation Opportunities and Perils in Data Science, he argued for a trans-disciplinary study of data science that includes the humanities and social sciences. As a Phi Beta Kappa Visiting Scholar in the 2018–19 academic year, Spector has presented these positions at various universities around the United States.

== Awards and recognition ==
In 2001, Spector received the IEEE Computer Society's Tsutomu Kanai Award for his contributions to distributed computing systems and applications. He and other researchers at Carnegie Mellon University won the 2016 ACM Software systems Award for developing the Andrew File System (AFS). He was elected to the National Academy of Engineering in 2004. He was inducted as a Fellow of the Association for Computing Machinery in 2006 and the American Academy of Arts and Sciences in 2009, and serves on its council.

Alfred appears in the Institutional Investor 2017 Tech 40 and was a Phi Beta Kappa Visiting Scholar during the 2018–19 academic year.
