= Antonopoulou =

Antonopoulou is a Greek surname that is the female version of Antonopoulos. Notable people with this name include the following:

- Maria N. Antonopoulou (born 1946), Greek sociology professor
- Sophia N. Antonopoulou (born 1947), Greek economics professor
- Rania Antonopoulou (born 1960), Greek politician
- Kareen Antonopoulou, birthname of French singer Kareen Antonn (born 1980)

== See also ==
- Antonopoulos
