= Teleprocessing monitor =

A teleprocessing monitor (also, Transaction Processing Monitor or TP Monitor) is a control program that monitors the transfer of data between multiple local and remote terminals to ensure that the transaction processes completely or, if an error occurs, to take appropriate actions.

The term is frequently used in mainframe-based wide area networks, where TP monitors manage the transfer of data between several clients making requests to a server. TP monitors will control and manage the data smoothly to available servers by detecting hardware failures and switching to another node.

Teleprocessing monitors were originally developed to allow several clients to connect to one server. However, they developed to what are now known as transaction processing monitors (TPMs). A TPM breaks down applications or code into transactions and ensures that all databases are updated in a single transaction. This is useful for airline reservations, car rentals, hotel accommodations, ATM transactions or other high volume transaction locations. TP monitors ensure that transactions are not lost or destroyed. Sometimes they are referred to as middleware, because the client sends the data for query or processing to the server database and then it is sent back to the user terminal. This can be accomplished remotely and by multiple users simultaneously. TP monitors are easily scalable allowing for increase in users and data processed.

Examples include the CICS (Customer Information Control System) for IBM mainframes introduced in July 1969, which can process thousands of transactions per second; IBM Information Management System (IMS, more specifically its IMS TM, also known as IMS DC, component); ACMS (Application Control Management System) for OpenVMS; UNIVAC TIP; Transarc Encina and Oracle Tuxedo are major TP monitors in the Unix client/server environment.

== See also ==
- Transaction processing system
- Transaction processing
