= IPIC =

IPIC may refer to:

== Technology ==
- IPIC Treaty, see Integrated circuit layout design protection
- IPIC, computer network protocol, see IBM TXSeries

== Organisations ==
- International Petroleum Investment Company
- Intellectual Property Institute of Canada, founded by Gordon Henderson (lawyer)
