= Skourletis =

Skourletis (Greek: Σκουρλέτης) is a Greek surname. It is the surname of:

- Konstantinos Skourletis (died 1888), Greek politician and mayor of Patras.
- Panos Skourletis (born 1962), Greek politician and Minister of Labour.
