= Michael L. Kazar =

American engineer and technology executive

- Education: Massachusetts Institute of Technology; Carnegie Mellon University
- Occupation: CTO of Avere Systems, Inc
- Known for: Andrew File System

Michael L. Kazar is an American engineer and technology executive.

Kazar received a Bachelor of Science in Mathematics and a Bachelor of Science in Electrical Engineering and Computer Science from the Massachusetts Institute of Technology and a Ph.D. from Carnegie Mellon University in Computer Science.

Kazar is a co-creator of Andrew File System (AFS) (AFS). He received the 2013 IEEE Reynold B. Johnson Information Storage Systems Award. This is an IEEE annual award given for outstanding contributions to information storage systems. Michael holds 38 patents related to file systems design. He worked at FORE Systems and co-founded Transarc in 1989 (acquired by IBM in 1994). Transarc commercialized AFS that was originally developed at Carnegie Mellon.

Kazar was chief technical officer (CTO) of Spinnaker Networks. Spinnaker Network was sold to Netapp in 2004. He co-founded and became CTO of Avere Systems, Inc, where he designed and oversaw the development of the Avere OS and the virtual cloud bursting software, the vFXT.

In 2016, Kazar received the ACM Software System Award for his work on the development of the Andrew File System.
