= IBM TXSeries =

Customer Information Control System environment

TXSeries for Multiplatforms
- Release: 1997; 29 years ago
- Stable release: v9.1 / November 15, 2016; 9 years ago
- Operating system: AIX, Windows Server, Solaris, HP-UX, Linux on x86
- Type: Transaction monitor
- License: Proprietary
- Website: www-03.ibm.com/software/products/en/txseries/

IBM TXSeries for Multiplatforms is a distributed CICS (Customer Information Control System) online transaction processing (OLTP) environment for mixed language applications.

TXSeries was introduced by IBM's Transarc subsidiary in 1997 and bundled CICS version 2.1.2 with Encina, MQSeries middleware, Lotus Domino Go web server, and other software.

TXSeries is a transaction server available on AIX, Linux x86, Windows Server. It shares similar design principles and some functions with CICS on z/OS.

End of 2006 saw a major release of TXSeries V6.1, simplifying the product by removing the DCE and Encina components and introducing a new graphical web-based administration console.

IBM TXSeries V9.1 introduced features to create RESTful APIs to extend existing applications for mobile and cloud, and to extend traditional applications in Java Enterprise Edition (EE) and deploy them on IBM WebSphere Application Server.

In July 2019, IBM announced IBM CICS TX on Cloud, a version of TXSeries that is aimed at cloud deployment and runs in containers.

== See also ==
- CICS
