= Antonios Antonopoulos =

Greek politician

Antonios Antonopoulos Αντώνιος Αντωνόπουλος 5th Mayor of Patras
- Born: 1805; Patras, (now Greece)
- Died: 1887 (aged 81–82); Patras, Greece
- Occupations: politician, mayor of Patras

Antonios Antonopoulos (Greek: Αντώνιος Αντωνόπουλος) (1805–1887) was a Greek politician of Achaia and a mayor of Patras.

He was born in Patras sixteen years before the Greek Revolution, in which he partook, being given the cross of the Order of the Redeemer. His father Dimitrios Antonopoulos was a delegate in the national council of Troizina (Troezen) and councillor. His brother Ioannis Antonopoulos served as mayor of Patras and a Minister of Justice.

He was elected mayor of Patras in 1847 but the government opposed him, since he was an anti-monarchist, and deposed him the same day, staying in office for one day. Konstantinos Skourletis was appointed in his place.

Antanopoulos was elected in to the municipal council many times starting from 1841, while he also served as president of the municipal council.

Antonois Antonopoulos died in Patras on 26 January 1887.

Preceded by Konstantinos Skourletis	Mayor of Patras (1847)	Succeeded by Konstantinos Skourletis (second run)
