= Mathematica Inc. =

Professional services research corporation

Mathematica, Inc.
- Company type: Employee-owned
- Industry: Professional services
- Founded: 1968
- Headquarters: Princeton, New Jersey, United States
- Number of locations: 9
- Key people: Oskar Morgenstern (Co-founder and Chairman); Tibor Fabian (Co-founder); William Baumol; William G. Bowen
- Services: Research and evaluation in health, education, and social policy
- Revenue: US$265,651,000 (FY2024)
- Number of employees: 1,900 (2024)
- Website: www.mathematica.org

Mathematica, Inc., formerly Mathematica Policy Research, is an American research organization and consulting company headquartered in Princeton, New Jersey. The company provides data science, social science, and technological services for social policy initiatives. At the end of 2024, Mathematica employed approximately 1,900 researchers, analysts, technologists, and practitioners in nine offices across the United States: Princeton, New Jersey; Cambridge, Massachusetts; Chicago, Illinois; Washington, D.C.; Ann Arbor, Michigan; Seattle, Washington; Woodlawn, Maryland; Tucson, Arizona; and Oakland, California. In 2018, the company acquired EDI Global, a data research company based in the United Kingdom and Africa. Mathematica's clients include federal agencies, state and local governments, foundations, universities, private-sector companies, and international organizations.

== History ==
The Industrial Surveys Company was founded by Samuel G. Barton in the late 1930s and merged with the Market Research Corporation of America (MRCA) in 1951. Oskar Morgenstern started a consultancy with other Princeton professors in 1958, becoming part of MRCA in 1959. The unit, known as Mathematica in the 1960s, was spun off in 1968 to allow for faster growth. Morgenstern remained chairman of the new corporation.

Historically, Mathematica had three divisions: Mathematica Products Group, best known for developing RAMIS, a fourth-generation programming language; MathTech, the company's technical and economic consulting group doing research projects and computer systems other than RAMIS; and Mathematica Policy Research, whose strength was in social experiments and surveys.

From 1968 until the early 1980s, the original Mathematica was largely owned by a group of Mathematics and Economics professors at Princeton University who, as they aged, opted to cash out by selling. The company's stock was split 3-for-2 in 1982 in anticipation, and Martin Marietta acquired all outstanding Mathematica stock the following year. This resulted in the following:

- Mathematica Products Group was renamed Mathematica & Oxford Software. It sold to On-Line Software International in 1986 and became part of Computer Associates in 1991.
- MathTech was spun-off and became an employee-owned company in 1986.
- Mathematica Policy Research also became employee-owned in 1986, and it is now the only company still carrying the Mathematica name.

== Research ==
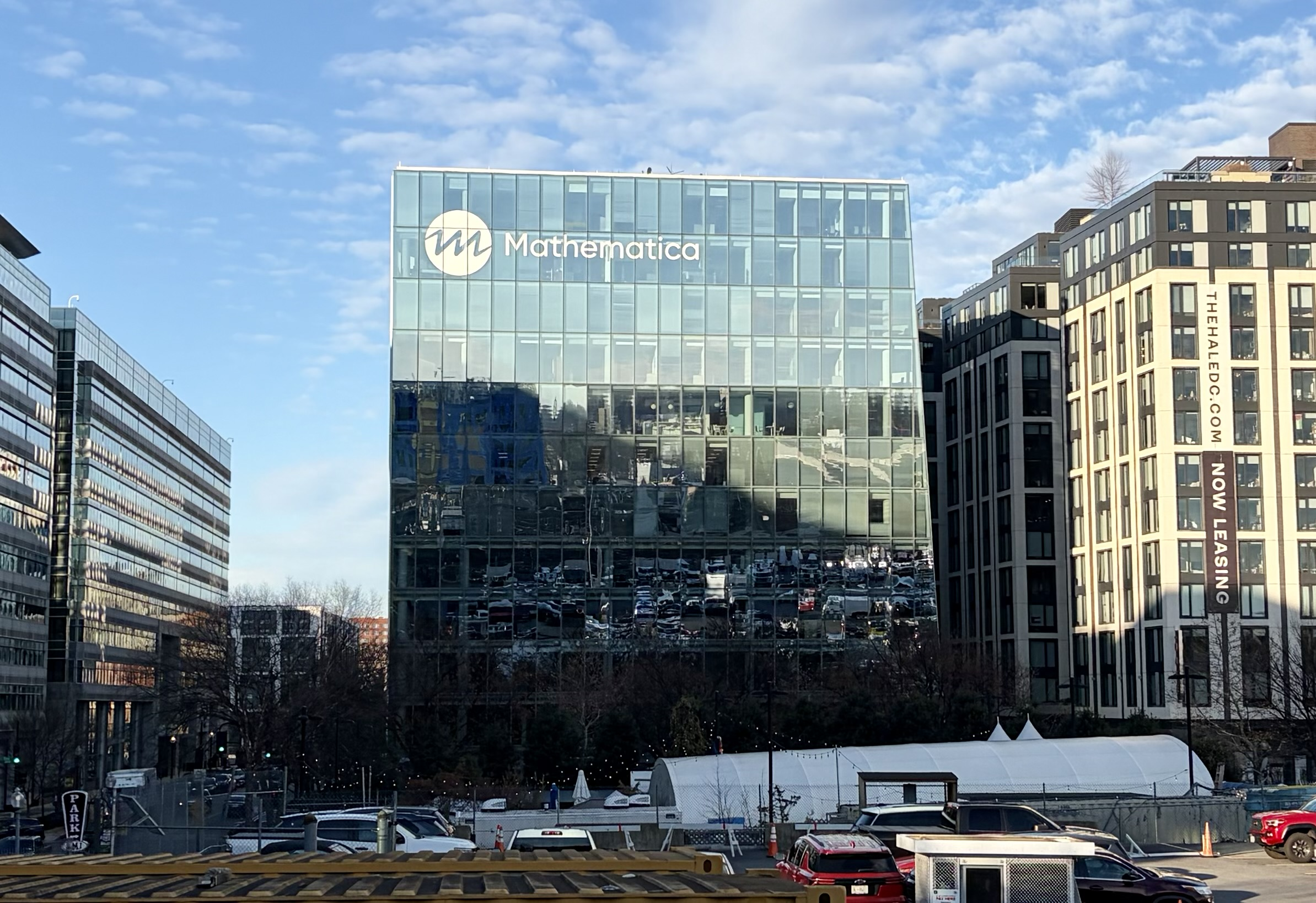
The Washington, D.C., offices of Mathematica Inc.

In 1968, Mathematica conducted the first social policy experiment in the United States, the New Jersey Income Maintenance Experiment (an experimental study of a negative income tax), to test ways of encouraging low-income individuals to work. The subdivision in charge of social experiments was renamed Mathematica Policy Research in 1975, and was known for its large-scale random assignment evaluations of policies and programs such as abstinence education and Job Corps.

In 1986, a group of employees purchased Mathematica Policy Research from its corporate parent Martin Marietta (now Lockheed Martin) and has since remained employee-owned, changing its name to Mathematica, Inc. in 2019.

=== Research centers ===
In early 1995, Mathematica formed a research affiliate, the Center for Studying Health System Change, which provides objective analyses of how the country’s changing health care system affects individuals and families.

In 2007, the company launched the Center for Studying Disability Policy (CSDP), to inform disability policy formation with rigorous, objective research, and data collected from the people disability policy aims to serve. CSDP provides leadership and support for disability research and data collection conducted by Mathematica.

In early 2008, Mathematica created the Center for Improving Research Evidence (CIRE), to identify, assess, and disseminate results from quality, rigorous research to inform evidence-based policymaking. CIRE also provides technical assistance in designing, conducting, assessing, and using a range of scientific policy research and evaluations to support a growing national and international research base.

In 2010, Mathematica established the Center on Health Care Effectiveness (CHCE), a resource for policymakers, the public, and other stakeholders.

In 2013, Mathematica established the Center for International Policy Research and Evaluation (CIPRE). Its focus is to provide research-based information to funders and policymakers addressing global development issues.

== Structure ==
Mathematica operates three business divisions: health, human services, and international research. The company specializes in program evaluation, policy analysis, survey design, data collection, data management, and interpretation. Policy topics include disability, early childhood, education, family support, health, international, labor, and nutrition.

After almost 20 years as an employee-owned company, Mathematica started offering an Employee Stock Ownership Plan (ESOP) in 2005. In recent years, Mathematica has begun offering services in data science, design, and visualization.
