= Avere Systems =

Technology company that produces computer data storage

Avere Systems, Inc
- Type: Private
- Founded: 2008
- Founder: Ronald Bianchini, Jr. Michael L. Kazar; Dan Nydick
- Headquarters: Pittsburgh, Pennsylvania, United States
- Key people: Ronald Bianchini, Jr., CEO; Michael L. Kazar, (CTO)
- Website: www.averesystems.com

Avere Systems was a privately held technology company that produced computer data storage and data management infrastructure. The company was founded in 2008 and is based in Pittsburgh, Pennsylvania. On January 3, 2018, the company announced that it was being acquired by Microsoft.

Avere's clients include the Centers for Disease Control and Prevention's Office of Infectious Diseases, the Library of Congress, Turner Broadcasting and Rising Sun Pictures.

== History ==
Avere Systems was founded in Pittsburgh in 2008 by Ronald Bianchini Jr., Ph.D., Michael L. Kazar, Ph.D. and Dan Nydick. In December 2008, Avere announced a $15 million (~$22 million in 2025) investment led by Menlo Ventures and Norwest Venture Partners. In August 2010, Avere raised $17 million (~$24.5 million in 2025), led by Tenaya Capital with participation of existing investors. In July 2012, Avere raised $20 million (~$27.7 million in 2025), led by Lightspeed Venture Partners. In 2014, the company announced an additional $20 million in venture financing, bringing the total to $72 million. The series D round was led by Western Digital Capital. Kazar, the company's CTO, received a lifetime achievement award in 2013 for his contributions to data storage from the world's largest technology professional membership association. Avere Systems and its CEO, Ronald Bianchini Jr. won the Carnegie Science Award for Information Technology in 2014.

In 2014, the company announced an additional $20 million in venture financing, bringing the total to $72 million. The Series D round was led by Western Digital Capital. In 2015, Avere was named as Google's cloud platform technology partner of the year.

In March 2017, Avere raised an additional $14 million (~$18.1 million in 2025) in a funding round that included previous investors and Google. As of March 2017, the company had raised over $90 million in funding.

On January 3, 2018, the company announced that it was being acquired by Microsoft. Terms of the acquisition have not been disclosed.

== Operations ==
Avere Systems released its first FXT Series storage appliances in November 2009. The FXT series uses automated storage tiering to process data. The company launched a virtual version of its filer, called the Virtual FXT Edge filer (vFXT) to enable customers to use cloud compute without moving data from on-premises storage. In 2016, Avere released the FXT 5000 series of edge filers, which doubled performance and capacity over previous models. The 5200 model was released for users with lower performance workloads in April 2016.

In September 2016, Avere released the C2N System, a hybrid NAS/object storage appliance.

Avere is a member of the Standards Performance Evaluation Corporation. and has active technology partnerships with Amazon Web Services, Google Cloud Platform, HGST/Amplidata, IBM, and SwiftStack. The Library of Congress uses Avere in its storage network for access to images and other digital resources requested by site visitors. In November 2014, Avere announced selection by the Centers for Disease Control's (CDC) Office of Infectious Diseases (OID) to power its genomic sequencing storage environment.

Avere's technology has been used by visual effects studios for rendering special effects as well as for cloud storage of data available to multiple users. The FXT Edge filers were designed to maximize storage performance to improve workload efficiency. All data is encrypted with AES-256 encryption and complies with federal security standard FIPS 140-2. Visual effects studios such as DreamWorks, Digital Domain, Image Engine and Framestore have been reported as using Avere technology.
