= Customer integrated system =

A Customer integrated system (CIS) is an extension or hybrid of the transaction processing system (TPS) that places technology in the hands of the customer and allows them to process their own transactions. CIS represents a way of doing business at substantial savings; customers save time and organizations can lower their human resource costs.

== Origin ==
In 1992, Bergen Brunswig, a distributor of diversified drug and health care products, unintentionally created a CIS. According to the story, Bergen Brunswig decided to equip its sales representatives with a portable computer which included a multimedia product encyclopedia and customers' account information. The clients became increasingly interested in this system and in some cases even requested to borrow it from the sales representatives for their own use. As a result, the head of Research and Development at Bergen Brunswig, Jim McLaughlin, came up with the idea of modifying the system so that it included order-entry software and to provide this new system to the pharmacist free of charge.

== Characteristics ==
The primary characteristic of a CIS is the transfer of data-entry and transaction-processing functions from employees to the customers themselves. This decentralization empowers customers by giving them direct control over their transactions, often 24 hours a day, without being limited by an organization's normal business hours.

From the organization's perspective, a CIS can significantly reduce operational costs by lowering the need for customer service staff to handle routine transactions and inquiries. This automation streamlines business processes and allows human resources to be redirected to more complex, high-value tasks.

For the customer, a CIS can reduce waiting times and provide a sense of empowerment, convenience, and control, which can lead to higher satisfaction. Furthermore, systems where customers input their own information (like shipping addresses or order details) can lead to higher data accuracy, as it removes the risk of transcription errors by an employee.

== Functions ==
While the specific functions of a CIS vary by industry, they generally fall into several key categories:

- Transaction processing: This is the core function, allowing customers to execute transactions independently. This includes placing an order in an e-commerce store, paying a bill through a utility portal, transferring funds in an online banking application, or booking a flight.
- Information retrieval: CIS provides customers with direct, on-demand access to information. Common examples include checking an account balance, tracking a package shipment, viewing past invoices, or searching a public-facing knowledge base for technical support.
- Account management: Customers can manage their own accounts and profiles without needing to contact a representative. This often includes updating personal information (like a shipping address or phone number), changing passwords, managing communication preferences, or upgrading/downgrading a service plan.
- Support initiation: While a key goal is to reduce routine support calls, many CIS integrate pathways to assisted support. This can include logging a formal support ticket, initiating a live chat session, or interacting with an AI-powered chatbot for immediate answers to common questions.

== Examples ==
Customer Integrated Systems are ubiquitous in modern business and public life. Examples include:

- Banking and finance: Automated Teller Machines (ATMs) are a classic example. Modern examples include online banking websites and mobile banking apps that allow customers to check balances, pay bills, deposit checks, and transfer funds (e.g., via Zelle or other P2P payment systems).
- Retail and e-commerce: Any e-commerce website (like Amazon or eBay) is a CIS, allowing users to browse, select, and purchase products. In physical retail, self-checkout kiosks and in-store price-check scanners are also forms of CIS.
- Travel and hospitality: Airline and hotel booking engines (like Expedia or an airline's direct website) allow customers to search for and book their own travel. Airport self-check-in kiosks are another prominent example.
- Education: University and college online portals allow students to register for classes, make tuition payments, check grades, and access course materials without interacting with administrative staff.
- Healthcare: Patient portals have become common, allowing patients to book appointments, view lab results, request prescription refills, and communicate with their doctor's office online.
- Telecommunications and utilities: Online customer portals for phone, internet, or electricity providers allow customers to view their usage, pay their bills, and upgrade or change their service plans.

== See also ==
- Transaction processing system
- Transaction processing
- Online transaction processing
- Online analytical processing
- Executive information systems
- Artificial intelligence
- Neural network
- Workgroup support system
- Groupware
- Spyware
