= Programmed Airline Reservations System =

Programmed Airline Reservations System (PARS)
- Developer(s): IBM
- Operating system: IBM Airline Control Program (ACP), Transaction Processing Facility (TPF)
- Type: Airline reservation application
- License: Proprietary software

Programmed Airline Reservations System (PARS) is an IBM proprietary large scale airline reservation application, a computer reservations system, executing under the control of IBM Airline Control Program (ACP) (and later its successor, Transaction Processing Facility (TPF)). Its international version was known as IPARS.

In 1953, IBM entered into discussions with American Airlines to explore the possibility of developing what are now known as airline reservations systems: a high-performance computer hardware and software solution capable of tracking all seat inventory and passenger reservations in real time for an airline.

Meanwhile, IBM entered into talks with other airlines while working with American, and signed contracts by 1960 to develop similar projects for Pan Am and Delta Air Lines. IBM created the internal code name SABER for its joint project to develop three slightly different airline reservations systems. American then sought a different name for its system, which became the Semi-Automated Business Research Environment, or SABRE. IBM made a serious error by implementing the three systems on three incompatible mainframe computers: DELTAMATIC ran on the IBM 7070, PANAMAC ran on the IBM 7080, and SABRE ran on the IBM 7090. In retrospect, it would have made more sense to implement all three on the IBM 7090.

After significant cost overruns and delays, IBM finished SABRE in 1964, followed by DELTAMATIC and PANAMAC in 1965. IBM then generalized its airline reservation technology into PARS, which was originally intended to support midsize carriers. It could run on models 40 through 75 of the IBM System/360 family, though Model 65 was the most popular one for airlines. In 1965, Eastern Air Lines was the first airline to agree to deploy PARS, under the name System One. That same year, British Overseas Airways Corporation became the first airline based outside of the United States to agree to deploy PARS under the name BOADICEA (after the ancient British queen). IBM revised the PARS software to add international features needed by BOAC, resulting in IPARS. From 1971 to 1973, American migrated Sabre from its original custom-made software running on IBM 7090 mainframes to a PARS-based platform running on System/360 mainframes. American's decision to migrate meant that nine of the ten largest U.S. major carriers were running on PARS.

In the early 1970s IBM modified PARS to accommodate the smaller regional airlines on smaller members of the IBM System/370 family. Meanwhile, the high-performance operating system of PARS was separated from the application code, and evolved from ACP (Airlines Control Program) to TPF (Transaction Processing Facility).

In the 1960s and 1970s, the combination of ACP and PARS provided unprecedented scale and performance for an online real-time system, and for a considerable period, ACP/PARS-based solutions ranked among the largest networks and systems of the era. In the early 1970s, major U.S. banks were developing major online application systems and were in urgent need of ACP's high-performance capabilities. ACP was made available by IBM to the banking industry in the mid-1970s. This system was used by the great majority of large airlines in the U.S. and internationally, and its smaller 1970s version was used by many smaller regional airlines. PARS and IPARS were extremely successful. PARS massively improved and revolutionized the efficiency of airline passenger operations and their profitability.

Along with many other major and regional U.S. airlines, PARS was later used by TWA and Northwest Airlines.

One source of confusion is that unlike the vast majority of PARS users, TWA failed to invent a unique name for its particular implementation of PARS and just called it PARS. Therefore, when discussing PARS, one must carefully distinguish between the general application program deployed by IBM to various airlines, and the specific implementation which was used only by TWA to manage its passenger reservations.
