= RAMIS =

Fourth-generation programming language (4GL)

RAMIS (Rapid Access Management Information System) is a fourth-generation programming language (4GL) capable of creating and maintaining databases consisting of named files containing both numeric and alphabetic fields and subsequently producing detailed simple or complex reports using a very simple English like language. As such it is easily mastered by non-programmers. A typical program - either to create or maintain a database or to create quite complex reports - would normally consist of a handful of lines of code which could be written or understood by non-professional programmers. "End users" as they became known. Such end users could be trained to use RAMIS in a matter of days and so large companies would often have several hundred such users scattered throughout the company.

== History ==
RAMIS was initially developed in the mid 1960s by the company Mathematica on a consulting contract for a marketing study by a team headed by Gerald Cohen and subsequently further developed and marketed as a general purpose data management and analysis tool. In 1974, Cohen fell out with the management of Mathematica and left to form his own company. Shortly thereafter his new company released a new product called FOCUS which was very similar to RAMIS: "the same bugs and the same misspelled error messages."

National CSS (NCSS), a Time-sharing vendor, licensed rights to make RAMIS available on its VP/CSS system.

At some point Mathematica changed its licensing price.

The interested parties were:

- NCSS, which was marketing RAMIS (and other products) for use on their time-sharing system
- Mathematica, owner of RAMIS
- Key developers/programmers of RAMIS
  - some stayed with Mathematica
  - others left to form the company that became Information Builders, known for their FOCUS product

Most of the programming team remained with Mathematica as did almost all the sales force. By this time RAMIS had double digits of client companies in both the US and a European division headquartered in London and so Mathematica decided to create a new division called Mathematica Products Group and rename the product RAMIS II. At the same time, the company decided to recall Frank Fish - originally a Mathematica consultant who had been assigned to lead a European consulting team and had subsequently formed the European RAMIS group - to head up the RAMIS II design team and International Sales.

Sales of both RAMIS II and FOCUS continued to grow through the 1980s throughout the western world with RAMIS II generally outselling FOCUS on mainframes though no detailed figures are available. RAMIS II was eventually installed in some 40 countries worldwide.

=== Purchased by Martin Marietta ===
MPG itself eventually grew to more than 500 staff with roughly 200 involved with RAMIS II. The company was largely owned by a group of professors in Mathematics and Economics at Princeton University and, as this group aged, they opted to cash out by selling to Martin Marietta Corporation (subsequently Lockheed Martin) in 1983.

RAMIS II continued to grow for another 4 years until most of the top people in RAMIS II design and sales quit in reaction to policy changes imposed by Lockheed Martin. Roughly 2 years later Lockheed Martin sold the RAMIS II group to another software firm whose background and culture was so different from Mathematica that they were unable to make a success of the product and they in turn sold the product to another company for its maintenance revenue.

=== Three-way split ===
In 1987 RAMIS was sold to On-Line Software International until it was acquired by its current owners, Computer Associates.

By the time the company was about to be purchased by Computer Associates (CA Technologies), the results were

- NCSS, with its own database software, NOMAD

("We’ve got to replace RAMIS, and we’re going to build our own product.")

- Mathematica, with its RAMIS offering
- Information Builders, with its FOCUS offering

== RAMIS syntax ==
The RAMIS syntax has been described as

- "allows you to use English-like commands to prepare reports and graphs from your RAMIS files."
- "a fourth-generation programming language capable of generating reports using simple language and many fewer lines of code than previous third-generation programing languages such as COBOL."

== Market acceptance ==
While the initial timesharing/mainframe product was positively accepted, the initial PC version didn't get the same reception:

=== Less positive ===
- "Ramis is a compromise 4GL relational database management system. It lacks SQL, a full programming language, good tech support, and the brute-force capabilities and sophistication of its competition. But it's remarkably easy to learn and use, comes with decent documentation, and performs the database basics."

=== Less negative ===
- "In Short: Ramis is an easy-to-use, pop-up menu database query and reporting tool for end users. However, its lack of a sophisticated applications development environment will preclude its use for more complicated demands."
