= IBM Airline Control Program =

Operating system developed by IBM beginning about 1965

Airline Control Program (ACP)
- Developer: IBM
- OS family: Transaction Processing Facility (TPF)
- Working state: Discontinued
- Initial release: 1968; 57 years ago (as part of PARS; separated in 1969)
- Latest release: 9.2.1 / February 1979; 46 years ago
- Marketing target: Programmed Airline Reservations System
- Available in: English
- Platforms: most models of the IBM System/360 mainframe computer family

IBM Airline Control Program, or ACP, is a discontinued operating system developed by IBM beginning about 1965. In contrast to previous airline transaction processing systems, the most notable aspect of ACP is that it was designed to run on most models of the IBM System/360 mainframe computer family. This departed from the earlier model in which each airline had a different, machine-specific transaction system.

== Overview ==
Development began with SABRE (Semi-Automatic Business Research Environment), Deltamatic, and PANAMAC. From these, the Programmed Airline Reservations System (PARS) was developed. In 1969 the control program, ACP, was separated from PARS. PARS kept the functions for processing airline reservations and related data.

In December 1979, ACP became known as ACP/TPF and then just TPF (Transaction Processing Facility). The transaction operating system became more widely implemented by businesses other than the major airlines, such as online credit card processing, hotel and rental car reservations, police emergency response systems, and package delivery systems.

The last "free" release of ACP, 9.2.1, was intended for use in bank card and similar applications. It was shipped on a "mini-reel" which contained a complete ACP system and its libraries for restoration to IBM 3340 disk drives. From that complete system one could easily create derivative works. A hypervisor was included, which allowed OS/370 VS1 or VS2 (SVS or MVS) to be run as a "guest" OS under ACP itself. The end-user documentation, which was shipped with the tape, took almost 60 linear inches of shelf space.

See also IBM Airline Control System (ALCS), a variant of TPF specially designed to provide all the benefits of TPF (very high speed, high volume, high availability transaction processing) but with the advantages such as easier integration into the data center offered by running on a standard IBM operating system platform.

== See also ==
- Timeline of operating systems
