= Constantinos Antonopoulos =

Greek businessman

Κωνσταντίνος Αντωνόπουλος (Constantinos Antonopoulos)
- Born: Patras, Greece
- Education: National Technical University of Athens, University of Manchester (UMIST)
- Occupation: CEO of Intralot

Constantinos Antonopoulos (Greek: Κωνσταντίνος Αντωνόπουλος) is a founding member, shareholder and CEO of Intralot.

== Business ==
Constantinos Antonopoulos is a founding member and shareholder of Intralot, a Greek company that supplies integrated gaming, transaction processing systems, game content, sports betting management and interactive gaming services to state-licensed gaming organizations worldwide. Since the company's establishment in 1992, he has held the position of chief executive officer. Under his leadership, the company expanded its global presence to 56 countries, employing a workforce of over 5,500 people. Additionally, he holds the chairmanship in several companies within the group and serves as a non-executive member of the board of directors of Intracom Holdings. In November 2014 Constantinos Antonopoulos resigned from his position as Intralot's CEO.

== Honors & Affiliations ==
Constantinos Antonopoulos was honored with numerous significant distinctions, including international recognition in the “Lottery industry Hall of Fame”, acknowledging him as one of the most important professionals in the lottery industry An essential initiative led by Constantinos Antonopoulos was Intralot’s founding membership in the Global Growth Companies community, recognized as the “New Champions of the World Economic Forum”. Additionally, he serves as a board member of the Federation of Greek Industries (SEV) and participates in the Foreign Affairs Executive Committee of the Federation (SEV International).

== Personal info ==
Born in the city of Patras, Constantinos Antonopoulos graduated in 1976 from the National Technical University of Athens with a degree in electrical engineering. He continued his studies at the University of Manchester (UMIST), England and received a Master of Science (M.Sc.) degree in systems reliability. He is married and father of three children.
