= Transarc =

American software company, 1989–1994

Transarc Corporation
- Industry: Software
- Founded: 1989; 37 years ago
- Founders: Jeffrey Eppinger; Michael L. Kazar; Alfred Spector; Dean Thompson
- Defunct: 2002
- Fate: Acquired by IBM, 1994; became IBM Transarc Lab 1999, IBM Pittsburgh Lab 2001, closed 2002
- Headquarters: Pittsburgh, Pennsylvania
- Products: AFS, DFS, Encina

Transarc Corporation was a private software company based in Pittsburgh, Pennsylvania, founded in 1989 by Carnegie Mellon University researchers Jeffrey Eppinger, Michael L. Kazar, Alfred Spector and Dean Thompson. The company was formed to commercialise the Andrew File System (AFS), a distributed file system originally developed at Carnegie Mellon. IBM acquired Transarc in 1994.

== History and products ==
Transarc's core mission was to bring the Andrew File System to market as an enterprise distributed file system. AFS allowed users to access files across a network as if they were stored locally, with strong security, caching and location transparency. The open-source descendant of the original AFS code, OpenAFS, continues to be maintained as a community project.

As a member of the Open Software Foundation (later The Open Group), Transarc developed the DFS distributed filesystem component for the Distributed Computing Environment (DCE), a suite of middleware standards sold by Open Group members. Transarc also produced Encina, a distributed transaction processing system that served as the basis for IBM's Unix-based CICS products, later incorporated into IBM's TXSeries and subsequently WebSphere. The company also distributed a Solaris binary of the DCE.

IBM acquired Transarc in 1994. The organisation was renamed the IBM Transarc Lab in 1999, then the IBM Pittsburgh Lab in 2001, before IBM closed the lab in 2002.
