= On-Line Software International =

American software company, 1969–1991

- Industry: Software
- Founded: 1969
- Defunct: 1991
- Fate: Acquired by Computer Associates
- Headquarters: Fort Lee, New Jersey

On-Line Software International, Inc. was a mainframe software company based in Fort Lee, New Jersey, founded in 1969. The company is best known for RAMIS, a widely-used fourth-generation report management and query system for IBM mainframe environments. On-Line Software was acquired by Computer Associates in 1991.

== History ==
On-Line Software International was established in 1969 and built its business around mainframe productivity and report management tools. The company appeared regularly in earnings coverage by The New York Times throughout the 1980s and early 1990s.

In late 1986, On-Line Software acquired RAMIS from Martin Marietta Corporation. RAMIS had originally been developed by Mathematica Inc., which had sold it to Martin Marietta in 1983. The acquisition gave On-Line Software a leading mainframe query and report-writing product. The company also offered English, a natural-language front-end to RAMIS that allowed less technical users to query databases using plain-text commands.

Computer Associates acquired On-Line Software in 1991, taking on the RAMIS product line in the process.

== Shareholders litigation ==
A claim by a former On-Line Software shareholder against Computer Associates resulted in a 2002 court award of $5.7 million, plus interest of $4.6 million, covering the period since the 1991 acquisition, due to violations committed during that transaction.
