= Konstantinos Skourletis =

Greek politician

Konstantinos Skourletis Κωνσταντίνος Σκουρλέτης
- Born: Greece
- Died: 1888; Greece
- Occupation: mayor of Patras

Konstantinos Skourletis (Greek: Κωνσταντίνος Σκουρλέτης, died 1888) was a Greek politician and a mayor of Patras.

He became a mayor of the city from 1844 until 1851. In 1847 due to the situation at the time, he replaced Antonios Antonopoulos as mayor of the city, as the former was a royalist and the latter an anti-royalist. He managed the trade crisis successfully. He died in 1888.

Preceded by Andreas Lontos	Mayor of Patras (1844-1847 late-1847-1851 for several terms)	Succeeded by Antonios Antonopoulos (first time); Ioannis Antonopoulos (second time)
