= Maria N. Antonopoulou =

Greek sociologist (born 1946)

- Born: 6 June 1946

Academic background
- Education: University of Athens; University of Birmingham

Academic work
- Discipline: Social Theory; Sociology of Knowledge; Philosophy
- Notable ideas: Critique of Marxist materialism; Sociology of knowledge; Historical categories in Weber and Marx

Maria N. Antonopoulou (Greek: Μαρία Ν. Αντωνοπούλου; born 1946) is an emeritus professor at the Panteion University of Social and Political Sciences Athens, Department of Sociology. She holds a PhD in sociology, Birmingham University, UK. She has published four books and several articles.

== Biography ==
Maria N. Antonopoulou was born in Athens, in 1946. She completed her secondary education at the Tossitsion Arsakion high school of Athens. She studied history and archeology at the National and Kapodistrian University of Athens. She obtained her degree in March 1971. In October of the same year she followed the postgraduate course of “Diploma in Social Sciences”, at the University of Birmingham, U.K., which she obtained in July 1972. In October of the same year (1972) she followed a Master course in Sociology. She was awarded her Ph.D. degree in July 1976. Since May 1977 she has been teaching at the Department of Sociology of the Panteion University, originally as a lecturer, an assistant professor (1984), an associate professor (1989), and since 2000 as a full professor.

== Research interest and content of works ==
In the Ph.D. thesis (1976) Method and Reality in Max Weber, she undertakes an analysis of Max Weber's methodology. In 1992 (2nd. ed.) she published the book Theory and Ideology in the Thought of the Sociological Classics. The work attempts to locate the ‘ideological’’ premises of the theoretical constructions of the sociological classics (Comte, Marx, Durkheim, Pareto, Weber, Simmel). In 2000 she published the book Social Action and Materialism. Study in Sociology of Knowledge. The book treats the abstraction of matter as a historical concept and of the theory of materialism as theory and ideology of the commodity society, par excellence of the capitalist society. In 2008 she published the book The Sociological Classics. Social Theory and Modern Society. The book examines the formation of sociology as a distinct social science and the theories of the sociological classics within the context of the formation of modern society. In 2011 she edited the book Max Weber. Our contemporary, which includes articles by distinguished scholars on Weber.

== Works ==
=== Βooks ===
- (in Greek) Θεωρία και Ιδεολογία στην Σκέψη των Κλασσικών της Κοινωνιολογίας. (Theory and Ideology in the Thought of the Sociological Classics). Papazissis Editions, 2nd edition, Athens, 1992
- (in Greek) Κοινωνική Πράξη και Υλισμός. Σπουδή στην Kοινωνιολογία της Γνώσης. (Social Action and Materialism. Study in Sociology of Knowledge, Alexandreia editions, Athens, 2000. ISBN 960-221-186-5
- (in Greek) Οι Κλασσικοί της Κοινωνιολογίας. Κοινωνική Θεωρία και Νεώτερη Κοινωνία. (The Sociological Classics. Social Theory and Modern Society), Savalas editions, Athens, 2008. ISBN 978-960-449-224-4
- (in Greek) Μαρία Ν. Αντωνοπούλου (ed.) Max Weber, o Σύγχρονός μας (Max Weber, our Contemporary), Nissos editions, Athens, 2011. ISBN 978-960-9535-12-0

=== Articles ===
- (in English)“The social historical nature of the concept of matter and the historical content of the theory of materialism”, in C.Mongardini (ed.) La Sociologia del Futuro, Bulzoni Editore, Roma, 2004.
- (in English) “What short of a social bond is instrumental.global communication? A critical approach”, in C. Mongardini (ed.) La Civilta della Communicazione Globale, Bulzoni Editore, Roma, 2002. (with Sophia N. Antonopoulou)
- (in Greek) “Value-ideas, historical societies and knowledge in Max Weber” in, M.N.Antonopoulou-S.Chiotakis (eds.) Max Weber, our Contemporary, Nissos editions, 2011.
- (in Greek) “For the relation of Weber to Marx”, in M.N. Antonopoulou-S.Chiotakis (eds.) Max Weber, our Contemporary, Nissos editions, 2011.
- (in Greek) “The social significance of science and knowledge in Max Weber”, in M.Thanopoulou et al. (eds.) Aspects of Social Dynamics. Gutenberg editions, 2011.
- (in Greek) “Values, rationalism, science and politics in Max Weber” in M.Aggelidis et al. (eds) Theory Values and Critique, Polis editions, 2008.
- (in Greek) “Global capitalism and information society. Information technology and modernity”, Utopia, 28, 1998.
- (in Greek) “Social subject and political reason” Koutsiaras (ed.) Social Sciences: In Quest for the Political. Diavazo editions, 1993.
- (in Greek) “Instrumental science and society. The case of Medicine” . Notebooks of Psychiatry, 43,1993.
- (in Greek) “The crisis of the Universities, institutional and social crisis”, in Sakis Karagiorgas Institute, The University in Greece Today, Economic, Social and Political Dimensions, 1991.
- (in Greek) “Rationalism and social sciences”, Centre of Marxist Studies, The French Revolution and Contemporary Critical Thought, Herakleitus Editions, 1989
- (in Greek) “The version of developmental Marxism in Greece and its contestation: 1930-1945”, Historica, 9, 1989.
- (in Greek) “Marx and sociology”, Diavazo 119, 1985.
- (in Greek) “The crisis of Marxist theory: Traditional Marxism and the attempts of its overcoming”, Politis, 68,1984.
- (in Greek) ‘The theory of history in Max Weber”, in Review of Social Research, 52, 1984.
- (in Greek) “Underdevelopment. The pretext for perpetuating dependence” in Economy and Society, 8 & 10, 1980.
- (in Greek) “historical consciousness and national identity. Nation and culture”, in L.Vassis (ed.) Tradition and Modernisation in Greece of the 21st Century, Taxideutis editions, 2007.
