= Sophia N. Antonopoulou =

Greek economist

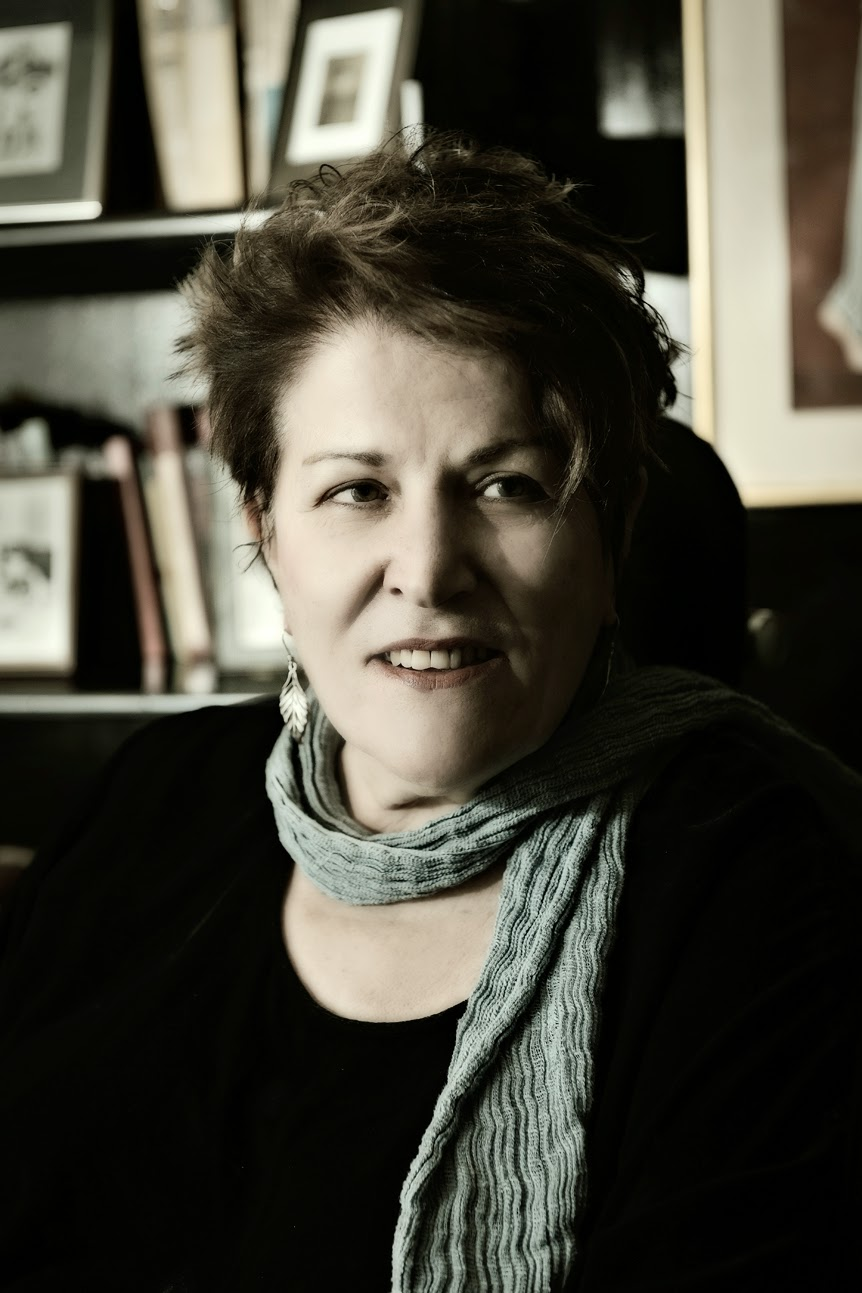
- Antonopoulou on 18 November 2013.
- Born: 4 October 1947; Athens, Greece

Academic background
- Education: National Technical University of Athens; University College London

Academic work
- Discipline: Greek Economy; International Economy; Philosophy
- Notable ideas: Greek socio-economic formation; 2008 financial crisis; Contemporary capitalism and globalization; Critique of the Enlightenment; Critique of the Marxist theory; Conception of Knowledge as a unity of subject-object

Sophia N. Antonopoulou (Greek: Σοφία Ν. Αντωνοπούλου; born 1947) is a professor at the National Technical University of Athens, Greece and holds a PhD in economics from the University College London, UK. She has published four books as well as scientific and opinion articles in numerous publications in Greece and abroad.

== Biography ==
Antonopoulou was born in Athens, in 1947. She completed her primary education at the Tossitsion Arsakion High School of Athens, where she developed a strong interest in philosophy, reading Plato systematically. At the age of eighteen she wrote her first philosophical essays, in which she analyzed and interpreted the theory of Ideas of Plato.

Antonopoulou studied civil engineering at the National Technical University of Athens (NTUA), she graduated in 1971 and worked as a civil engineer in construction firms and consultants between 1971 and 1975. She was appointed as an assistant at the School of Architecture, NTUA in 1976 and was granted a sabbatical to pursue postgraduate studies in economics at the University College London, UK in 1980. She returned to Athens and resumed her duties at the NTUA in 1983. She was awarded her PhD by the University College London, UK, in 1987.

Since 1976 she has been teaching at the School of Architecture, Dept. of Urban and Regional Planning (NTUA), originally as an assistant (1976), a lecturer (1989), an assistant professor (1993), an associate professor (2003), and since 2009 as a full professor.

== Research interests and content of works ==
Antonopoulou's research interests focus on the Greek and international economy, as well as on philosophy. In 1989 she published the work The Political and Economic Thought of Rosa Luxemburg. The Critique of K. Marx’s Capital (Papazissis, Athens, 1989) (in Greek), where she exposed the critique of Luxemburg to Karl Marx's Capital, Volume I, going further to show that the 'solution' that Luxemburg gave to the problem of the expanded reproduction of capital was in its turn problematic. For the first time, in this work Sophia Antonopoulou exposed her view that Marx's Capital forms a theoretical economic paradigm, which in essence constitutes an analysis in which the class struggle is absent, a dimension fundamental to the capitalist economy and society. This work was published before the collapse of the Eastern Bloc. It influenced the Greek intelligentsia and was characterized as prophetic.

Sophia Antonopoulou developed this critique of Marx and Marxism in her book The Marxist Theory of Development and its Convergence with the Bourgeois Theoretical Paradigm (Papazissis, Athens, 1991) (in Greek), in which she criticizes the theoretical model that Marx had developed with respect to the economy, society and history, as well as Marx's philosophical theory (Dialectical and Historical Materialism). In 1991 she published an analysis of the post-war Greek economy and society entitled The Post War Transformation of the Greek Economy and the Settlement Phenomenon 1950-1980 (Papazisis, Athens, 1991) (in Greek) based on her PhD thesis. In 2008 she published a multilateral and complex analysis of contemporary capitalism entitled Contemporary Capitalism and Globalization (Exandas, Athens, 2008) (in Greek).

== Works ==
=== Books ===
- (in Greek) Σύγχρονος Καπιταλισμός και Παγκοσμιοποίηση (Contemporary Capitalism and Globalization) (Exandas, Athens, 2008) ISBN 978-960-256-667-1
- (in Greek) Ο Mεταπολεμικός Mετασχηματισμός της Eλληνικής Oικονομίας και το Oικιστικό Φαινόμενο, 1950-1980 (The Postwar Transformation of the Greek Economy and the Settlement Phenomenon 1950-1980) (Papazisis, Athens, 1991) ISBN 978-960-02-0861-0.
- (in Greek) Η Μαρξιστική Θεώρηση της Ανάπτυξης και η Σύγκλισή της με το Αστικό Θεωρητικό Πρότυπο ("The Marxist Theory of "Development" and its Convergence with the Bourgeois Theoretical Paradigm") (Papazisis, Athens, 1991) ISBN 978-960-02-0933-4.
- (in Greek) Η Πολιτική και Oικονομική Σκέψη της Ρόζας Λούξεμπουργκ. Η Κριτική στο "Κεφάλαιο" του Καρλ Μαρξ (The Political and Economic Thought of Rosa Luxembourg. The Critique of K. Marx’s Capital) (Papazisis, Athens, 1989)

=== Articles ===
- "The Global Financial Crisis," The International Journal of Inclusive Democracy, Vol. 5, No. 4 / Vol. 6, No. 1 (Autumn 2009 / Winter 2010).
- "Global capital, neo-liberalism and the nation-state", in Seminars of the Aegean, Rethinking Radical Spatial Approaches, (Naxos 2003) proceedings, Athens (2005)
- "What sort of social bond is instrumental global communication? A critical approach"(with Maria N. Antonopoulou) in C. Mongardini (ed) La Civiltá della comunicazione globale, Bulzoni Editore, Rome (2002).
- "The process of globalization and class transformation in the west," Democracy & Nature, Vol. 6, No. 1 (March 2000), pp. 37–54. abstract.
- "The economic and monetary union of Europe and the socio-spatial inequalities associated with it" in Seminars of the Aegean, Geographies of integration. Geographies of inequality in Europe after Maastricht, (proceedings), Syros (1993)
- (in Spanish) "Globalización y transformaciones sociales en Occidente" (2007)
- (in French) "Mondialisation et transformations sociales dans les pays occidentaux", Les Temps Maudits, No 10, Juin (2001).
- (in Italian) "I nuovi padroni della globalizzazione," Libertaria n. 4 (2000).
- (in Greek) «Η ελληνική τραγωδία και οι προοπτικές εξόδου από την κρίση» ("The Greek tragedy and the prospects for an exodus from the crisis"), Pontiki (political and economic daily), 23 February 2012.
- (Greek) "H Ελλάδα και ο νέος Γερμανικός οικονομικός πόλεμος" ("Greece and the new German economic war") Pontiki (political and economic daily) 22 March 2012
- (in Greek) «Η παγκόσμια χρηματοπιστωτική κρίση» ("The global financial crisis") Ουτοπία: επιθεώρηση Θεωρίας και Πολιτισμού, τχ. 83 (Ιανουάριος-Φεβρουάριος 2009), σελ. 31
- (in Greek) «Διαφωτισμός, "αντικειμενική" σκέψη και υλιστικός αναγωγισμός», ("Enlightenment, 'objective' thought and materialist reductionism"), Ίνδικτος, τχ. 19, (2005).
- (in Greek) «Παγκοσμιοποίηση και έθνος-κράτος» ("Globalization and the nation-state"), Άρδην, τχ 48 (2004)
- (in Greek) «Η οικονομική και νομισματική ένωση της Ευρώπης στο πλαίσιο της παγκοσμιοποίησης» ("The economic and monetary union of Europe within the framework of globalization"), Ουτοπία, τχ. 51, (2002).
- (in Greek) «Η παγκοσμιοποίηση της οικονομίας, ο νεοφιλελευθερισμός και η κοινωνία των 2/3» ("The globalization of the economy, neo-liberalism and the society of 2/3"), Ουτοπία, τχ. 35, (1999)
- (in Greek) «To κυρίαρχο πρότυπο ανάπτυξης και η μαρξιστική απόπειρα υπέρβασής του,»(The prevalent paradigm of development and the Marxist attempt at its transcendence) Ουτοπία: επιθεώρηση Θεωρίας και Πολιτισμού, τχ. 26 (Σεπτέμβριος-Οκτώβριος 1997), σελ. 119
- (in Greek) «Διχοτόμηση του Αιγαίου και ΝΑΤΟ» ("Division of the Aegean and the NATO") Άρδην, τχ 8 (1997).
- (in Greek) «Οι συνέπειες της οικοδομικής παραγωγής και του καθεστώτος γαιοκτησίας στην κοινωνικο-οικονομική συγκρότηση της μεταπολεμικής Ελλάδας» ("The consequences of building production and of the regime of land ownership in the socio-economic formation of post-war Greece"), στο Η Ελληνική κοινωνία κατά την πρώτη μεταπολεμική περίοδο, 1945–1967, Ίδρυμα Σάκη Καράγιωργα, Αθήνα (1994).
- (in Greek) «Το χρηματιστικό κεφάλαιο επέβαλε το Μάαστριχτ» ("The financial capital imposed the Treaty of Maastricht") Οικονομικός Ταχυδρόμος (7 Απριλίου 1994).
- (in Greek) «Οι συνέπειες της ΟΝΕ για την Ελλάδα» ("The consequences of the Economic and Monetary Union of Europe for Greece"), Οικονομικός Ταχυδρόμος, (27 Απριλίου 1994).
- (in Greek) «Εκβιομηχάνιση, αγροτική έξοδος και το ζήτημα της στέγης στις χώρες της περιφέρειας κατά τη μεταπολεμική περίοδο» ("Industrialization, rural exodus and the issue of housing in the peripheral countries during the post-war period"), Επιθεώρηση Κοινωνικών Ερευνών, τχ 69 (1988).
- (in Greek) «Ο ιδιόμορφος χαρακτήρας της παραγωγής κατοικίας στην Ελλάδα και η ερμηνεία του» ("The peculiar character of the house-building production in Greece and its interpretation"), Τεχνικά Χρονικά, τομ. 8, τχ 2 (1988).
