= ALCS transaction monitor =

IBM mainframe application server

ALCS, which stands for Airline Control System, is an application server that provides industrial-strength, online transaction management for mission-critical applications.

ALCS is a transaction processing monitor for the IBM System/360, System/370, System/390, and IBM Z mainframes. It is a variant of TPF specially designed to provide all the benefits of TPF (very high speed, high volume, and high availability in transaction processing) but with the advantages such as easier integration into the data center offered by running on a standard IBM operating system platform.

Like TPF, it is primarily used in the airline, hotel, and banking industries.

Whereas TPF runs as a stand-alone OS, ALCS is designed to run as an application on top of MVS/OS/390/z/OS. However, the API it provides to applications is very similar to that on TPF, so applications written for TPF can run on ALCS with minimal modifications: typically fewer modifications than are required to move from one release of TPF to another. ALCS 2.3.1 runs on OS/390 2.10 and z/OS. ALCS 2.4.1 was released in June 2008.

Because it runs under standard IBM operating systems, it can easily leverage other developments or enhancements on those platforms. For example, to enable MQSeries for TPF required the porting, modification, and authoring of large volumes of code. To enable this on ALCS, only an interface to the MQ product on z/OS needed to be written. And any enhancements made to MQ Series on z/OS by the MQ team are available without any additional work on the part of the ALCS development team. This also applies to TCP/IP, Db2, VTAM, to a certain extent language support and even basic disk I/O.
