= Jeffrey Eppinger =

American computer scientist (born c. 1960)

Jeffrey Lee Eppinger (born ca 1960) is an American computer scientist, entrepreneur and professor at the Carnegie Mellon University, School of Computer Science.

== Biography ==
Eppinger was a student at Carnegie Mellon University, where in 1983, he won the George E. Forsythe Award for best undergraduate paper on his research in binary search trees. Eppinger had made empirical studies of their behaviour under random deletions and insertions.

Eppinger earned his PhD in Computer Science in 1988. His dissertation demonstrated the integration of the Mach Operating System's virtual memory with the Camelot Transaction System. This recoverable virtual memory concept was subsequently used to implement the Coda file system.

Eppinger was a co-founder of Transarc Corporation, which was acquired by IBM in 1994.

In 2001, Eppinger returned to Carnegie Mellon as Professor of the Practice in the School of Computer Science.

== Personal life ==
Eppinger is married with two children.
