= Andrew File System =

File system for computers

The Andrew File System (AFS) is a distributed file system which uses a set of trusted servers to present a homogeneous, location-transparent file name space to all the client workstations. It was developed by Carnegie Mellon University as part of the Andrew Project. Originally named "Vice", "Andrew" refers to Andrew Carnegie and Andrew Mellon. Its primary use is in distributed computing. It continues primarily as OpenAFS.

== Features ==
AFS has several benefits over traditional networked file systems, particularly in the areas of security and scalability. AFS uses Kerberos for authentication, and implements access control lists on directories for users and groups. Each client caches files on the local filesystem for increased speed on subsequent requests for the same file. This also allows limited filesystem access in the event of a server crash or a network outage.

AFS uses the weak consistency model. Read and write operations on an open file are directed only to the locally cached copy. When a modified file is closed, the changed portions are copied back to the file server. Cache consistency is maintained by callback mechanism. When a file is cached, the server makes a note of this and promises to inform the client if the file is updated by someone else. Callbacks are discarded and must be re-established after any client, server, or network failure, including a timeout. Re-establishing a callback involves a status check and does not require re-reading the file itself.

A consequence of the file locking strategy is that AFS does not support large shared databases or record updating within files shared between client systems. This was a deliberate design decision based on the perceived needs of the university computing environment. For example, in the original email system for the Andrew Project, the Andrew Message System, a single file per message is used, like maildir, rather than a single file per mailbox, like mbox. See AFS and buffered I/O Problems for handling shared databases.

A significant feature of AFS is the volume, a tree of files, sub-directories and AFS mountpoints (links to other AFS volumes). Volumes are created by administrators and linked at a specific named path in an AFS cell. Once created, users of the filesystem may create directories and files as usual without concern for the physical location of the volume. A volume may have a quota assigned to it in order to limit the amount of space consumed. As needed, AFS administrators can move that volume to another server and disk location without the need to notify users; the operation can even occur while files in that volume are being used.

AFS volumes can be replicated to read-only cloned copies. When accessing files in a read-only volume, a client system will retrieve data from a particular read-only copy. If at some point, that copy becomes unavailable, clients will look for any of the remaining copies. Again, users of that data are unaware of the location of the read-only copy; administrators can create and relocate such copies as needed. The AFS command suite guarantees that all read-only volumes contain exact copies of the original read-write volume at the time the read-only copy was created.

The file name space on an Andrew workstation is partitioned into a shared and local name space. The shared name space (usually mounted as /afs on the Unix filesystem) is identical on all workstations. The local name space is unique to each workstation. It only contains temporary files needed for workstation initialization and symbolic links to files in the shared name space.

The Andrew File System heavily influenced Version 4 of Sun Microsystems' popular Network File System (NFS). Additionally, a variant of AFS, the DCE Distributed File System (DFS) was adopted by the Open Software Foundation in 1989 as part of their Distributed Computing Environment. Finally AFS (version two) was the predecessor of the Coda file system.

== Implementations ==
Besides the original, a few other implementations were developed. OpenAFS was based on source released by Transarc (IBM) in 2000. Transarc software became deprecated and lost support. Arla was an independent implementation of AFS developed at the Royal Institute of Technology in Stockholm in the late 1990s and early 2000s.

A fourth implementation of an AFS client exists in the Linux kernel source code since at least version 2.6.10. Committed by Red Hat, this is a fairly simple implementation still incomplete as of January 2024.

== Available permissions ==
The following Access Control List (ACL) permissions can be granted:

Lookup (l)
allows a user to list the contents of the AFS directory, examine the ACL associated with the directory and access subdirectories.
Insert (i)
allows a user to add new files or subdirectories to the directory.
Delete (d)
allows a user to remove files and subdirectories from the directory.
Administer (a)
allows a user to change the ACL for the directory. Users always have this right on their home directory, even if they accidentally remove themselves from the ACL.

Permissions that affect files and subdirectories include:

Read (r)
allows a user to look at the contents of files in a directory and list files in subdirectories. Files that are to be granted read access to any user, including the owner, need to have the standard UNIX "owner read" permission set.
Write (w)
allows a user to modify files in a directory. Files that are to be granted write access to any user, including the owner, need to have the standard UNIX "owner write" permission set.
Lock (k)
allows the processor to run programs that need to lock files in the directory.

Additionally, AFS includes Application ACLs (A)-(H) which have no effect on access to files.

== OpenAFS ==
OpenAFS
- Original author: Carnegie Mellon University
- Developers: Transarc, IBM, OpenAFS Foundation
- Stable release: 1.8.16 / May 21, 2026; 2 months ago
- Written in: C
- Operating system: Cross-platform
- Type: Distributed File System
- License: IBM Public License
- Website: www.openafs.org
- Repository: https://git.openafs.org/openafs.git

OpenAFS is an open-source implementation of AFS. At LinuxWorld on 15 August 2000, IBM announced their plans to release a version of their commercial AFS product under the IBM Public License. This became OpenAFS. Today, OpenAFS is actively developed for a wide range of operating system families including: AIX, MacOS, Darwin, HP-UX, Irix, Solaris, Linux, Microsoft Windows, FreeBSD, NetBSD.

=== Licensing ===
Copyright on many original source files is attributed to IBM and other contributors. Most of the source is covered by the IBM Public License, however several files in the tree are covered by university vanity licenses.

On Feb 5, 2026 Brad Topol (IBM) announced that IBM approved license changes of IBM Developerworks OpenAFS 1.0 from IBM Public License to GPLv2.

=== OpenAFS Foundation ===
The OpenAFS Foundation was established on May 20, 2013 as a non-profit organization dedicated to fostering the stability and growth of OpenAFS. It does so by attracting and increasing the community of OpenAFS users, fostering the OpenAFS community of experts and nurtures the evolution of OpenAFS.

=== Releases ===
OpenAFS releases are announced on the OpenAFS Announcements mailing list. The current release is OpenAFS 1.8

Release versions of OpenAFS
Version	Initial release	Latest release
1.0	2000-11-04	2001-06-24
1.1	2001-07-16	2001-08-23
1.2	2001-09-12	2004-10-29
1.3	2002-02-16	2005-07-30
1.4	2005-08-21	2013-07-14
1.6	2010-12-16	2024-11-12
1.7	2011-09-16	2015-10-28
1.8	2016-12-07	2026-05-13
1.9	2020-10-02	
2.0		
Unsupported Supported Latest version Preview version Future version

== History ==
AFS originated at Carnegie Mellon University as part of the Andrew Project, named after Andrew Carnegie and Andrew Mellon. Development began around 1983 (with some sources citing the mid-1980s), initially under the name "Vice" The project aimed to create a scalable, location-transparent distributed file system for a campus-wide computing environment, emphasizing features like client caching, scalability to many clients per server, and Kerberos-based authentication.

Early work involved collaboration with IBM. AFS version 1 (sometimes called the ITC distributed file system) was followed by a redesigned AFS version 2 (or simply AFS) in the late 1980s, which improved scalability and cache consistency.

=== Commercialization by Transarc (Late 1980s–1990s) ===
In 1988 or 1989, Transarc Corporation was founded by Carnegie Mellon University employees to commercialize AFS. Transarc developed and supported server and client code for multiple operating systems, turning the research project into a commercial product.

Transarc was acquired by IBM in 1994 and later became part of IBM Pittsburgh Labs (around 1999). Under IBM/Transarc, AFS continued as a commercial offering with ongoing development.

=== Open Sourcing and Birth of OpenAFS (2000) ===
On 15 August 2000, at LinuxWorld, IBM announced plans to release the source code of its commercial AFS product under the IBM Public License (IPL 1.0, an OSI-approved open-source license). The code was released in November 2000 (with the open-source effort often dated to 1 November 2000), and the project was named OpenAFS. This made the codebase available for community development and maintenance. OpenAFS 1.0 followed shortly after, with its initial release on 4 November 2000. A group of volunteers and AFS enthusiasts, including those based at CMU, took on maintenance and further development.

=== Post-2000 Development and Community Governance ===
OpenAFS has been developed as a community-driven project since its open-sourcing, with contributions from volunteers, companies, and institutions. It supports a wide range of platforms, including various UNIX/Linux variants, macOS, Windows, and others. Development has focused on bug fixes, security improvements, kernel support (especially Linux), performance enhancements, and feature additions while maintaining compatibility with the AFS protocol.

Releases are tracked in series such as 1.0 (early), 1.2, 1.4, 1.6, and the current 1.8 series (with maintenance releases continuing into 2026, e.g., 1.8.16 in May 2026).

=== Ongoing Status ===
OpenAFS remains actively maintained as the open-source reference implementation of AFS with security and compatibility updates. It continues to be used in academic, research, and enterprise environments requiring a mature distributed file system.

== See also ==
- Global filesystem

== Bibliography ==
- Campbell, Richard (1 February 1998). Managing AFS (1st ed.). Prentice Hall. p. 479. ISBN 978-0-13-802729-2.
- Milicchio, Franco; Gehrke, Wolfgang (7 June 2007). Distributed Services with OpenAFS (1st ed.). Springer Science+Business Media. p. 395. ISBN 978-3-540-36634-8.
