= Encina (software) =

Encina was a DCE-based transaction processing system developed by Transarc, which was later acquired by IBM.

Until 2006 it was used as the basis of IBM TXSeries, which is a variant of CICS for non-mainframe platforms.
