= Ioannis Antonopoulos =

Greek politician (1810–1882)

Ioannis Antonopoulos Ιωάννης Αντωνόπουλος
- Born: 1810; Patras, Ottoman Empire
- Died: August 2, 1882 (aged 71–72); Greece
- Occupations: politician, mayor of Patras

Ioannis Antonopoulos (Greek: Ιωάννης Αντωνόπουλος, 1810 - October 28, 1882) was a Greek politician and a mayor of Patras.

He was born in Patras and was the son of Dimitrios Antonopoulos. He later studied law in Corfu and worked as a judge. He was elected mayor of Patras in 1851 and served until 1885. He was elected several times to the public council and attempted to become president of the municipal chamber.

He became a minister for Justice in 1849 and later the Economy. He was elected six times as parliamentary representative of Achaia and served as Speaker of the Hellenic Parliament. As justice minister, he ran the magistrate court and the court of appeal in Patras.

He organised the paving of the city's streets, constructed several fountains and lighted Ermou Street. He died on August 2, 1882.

Preceded by Konstantinos Skourletis	Mayor of Patras (1851-1855 for several terms)	Succeeded by Venizelos Rouphos
