= IBM 270x =

1960s-era IBM mainframe communication controllers

IBM 270x series
- Type: Communication controllers
- Released: 1967; 59 years ago
- Successor: IBM 37xx series

270x is a generic name for a family of IBM non-programmable communications controllers used with System/360 and System/370 computers.

The family consisted of the following devices:

- IBM 2701 Data Adapter Unit
- IBM 2702 Transmission Control
- IBM 2703 Transmission Control

The 2701 and 2702 were announced simultaneously with System/360 in 1964, the 2703 was announced a year later.

The 270x series was superseded by the IBM 3704 and 3705 communications controllers in 1972.

== 2701 ==
The 2701 supported up to four start-stop or synchronous communications lines. It had two multiplexor channel interfaces for connection to one or two host computers. The synchronous adapter originally supported the Synchronous Transmit-Receive (STR) protocol, and later Binary Synchronous Communications (BISYNC) when it was introduced in 1967, in half duplex mode at speeds of up to 40,800 bits per second (bit/s). The 2701 could also have "data acquisition and control adapters" for direct control of external equipment.

Initially the 2701 supported the following devices:

- IBM 1009 Data Transmission Unit
- IBM 1013 Card Transmission Terminal
- IBM 7701 Magnetic Tape Transmission Terminal
- IBM 7702 Magnetic Tape Transmission Terminal
- IBM 7710 Data Communication Unit
- IBM 7711 Data Communication Unit
- IBM 7740 Communication Control System
- IBM 7750 Programmed Transmission Control
- Remote System/360 with 2701
- Serial synchronous terminals
- IBM 1030 Data Collection System
- IBM 1050 Data Communication System
- IBM 1060 Data Communication System
- IBM 1070 Process Communication System
- AT&T 83B2 Type Selective Calling Terminals
- Western Union Plan 115A Outstations
- Common Carrier TWX Stations
- European Teleprinters
- Parallel data devices
- Contact sense terminals
- Contact operate terminals

Later the IBM 2740 and IBM 2741 Communication Terminals, and the IBM 2260/2848 were added.

== 2702 ==
The 2702 could accommodate up to 31 communication lines, but at a slower speed than the 2701. The System/360 Configurator indicates that in the 2702 supported start-stop lines only.

Initially the 2702 supported the following terminals:

- IBM 1030 Data Collection System
- IBM 1050 Data Communication System
- IBM 1060 Data Communication System
- IBM 1070 Process Communication System
- AT&T 83B2 Type Selective Calling Terminals
- Western Union Plan 115A Outstations
- Common Carrier TWX Stations
- European Teleprinters

Later the IBM 2740 and IBM 2741 Communication Terminals, the IBM 1032 Digital Time Unit, and a second channel interface were added.

== 2703 ==
The 2703 supported up to 176 half-duplex start-stop or Binary Synchronous communication lines. The maximum speed of one line was 2400 bit/s but the total aggregate line speed was limited. By 1970 the maximum line speed had been raised to 4800 bit/s. The 2703 attached to a single multiplexer channel; each communication line occupied a subchannel. It had a four or eight byte buffer per line to reduce data transfer to and from the host computer. The IBM 2712 Remote Multiplexer allowed up to fourteen slow speed devices to be multiplexed over one high speed line to a 2703.

As of 1967 the 2703 supported the following devices:

- IBM 1030 Data Collection System
- IBM 1050 Data Communication System
- IBM 1060 Data Communication System
- IBM 1070 Process Communication System
- IBM 2741 and 2740 Communications Terminals
- AT&T 83B2 Type Selective Calling Terminals
- Western Union Plan 115A Outstations
- Common Carrier TWX Stations
- Remote System/360 via 2701 with 2701 or 2703
- IBM 2780 Data Transmission Terminal
- IBM 1130 Computing System with Synchronous Communications Adapter (SCA)

== Clones ==
Many companies produced clones of 270x controllers, such as the Memorex 1270, introduced in 1970, and devices from NCR-Comten.
