= DUCS (software) =

DUCS (Display Unit Control System) was a teleprocessing monitor from CFS Inc. It was one of two early local teleprocessing packages for IBM's DOS/VSE environment. DUCS provided an interface and access method for programmers to 'talk' to monitors. Such access methods later became known as APIs.

Initially written for the IBM 2260 running under DOS on IBM mainframes, the original product was free for IBM users. With the advent of DOS/VS and the IBM 3270 series terminals, the original author commercialized the product, circa 1970. The company added transparent remote access about 1972.

The product is believed to be the first non-IBM publicly available commercial software package to transmit data via satellite.

== Application ==
DUCS differed from competing products such as Westi and IBM's own CICS in that it was subordinate to the application's mainline program. Westi, for example, was the mainline program and users wrote subroutines to read and write data to and from terminals and discs. This real time paradigm became known as transaction processing.

DUCS reversed that model in that it was, in fact, a subroutine package that read from and wrote to monitors, both local and remote. While DUCS was considerably easier to program and use, it also placed the onus of task management upon the programmer. Correctly designed, a DUCS program was faster than any competing package or access method.

== Development ==
=== 2260 ===
Dick Goran wrote the original DOS 2260 package. Its popularity made him realize it had potential as a commercial product, and he left IBM about 1970, and incorporated in Brookline, Massachusetts as CFS, Inc.

=== 3270 ===
In 1972, IBM released DOS/VS with the IBM/370 and the first IBM 3270 terminals, and CFS began a rewrite for the new products. Former New York City IBMer, Leigh Lundin, wrote DUCS Remote, a bi-sync module to handle remote teleprocessing. The bi-sync handler was only 4k, in contrast to IBM's BTAM at 28k, QTAM at 36k, and TCAM at 42k, and VTAM which started at 48k.

=== Demos ===
Lundin wrote games in Fortran and Assembler and Goran in COBOL to demonstrate the API for programmers. To model IBM's new light pen, programmers contributed a simple tic-tac-toe (noughts and crosses), possibly the only practical use of the subsequently discontinued light pen.

== Marketing ==
DUCS was sold in North America by CFS, Inc, Brookline, Ma.

For overseas sales, CFS engaged in both mail order and local vendors.
