= Virtue (disambiguation) =

Virtue is moral excellence.

Virtue(s) may also refer to:

== Film and television ==
- Virtue (film), a 1932 American film starring Carole Lombard and Pat O'Brien
- The Virtues (TV series), a 2019 British drama series
- "Virtue" (Law & Order), a 1994 television episode

== Music ==
- Virtue (musical group), an American gospel music trio
- Virtue (band), a British heavy metal band
- The Virtues (band), a 1950s American rock and roll band
- Virtue (Eldar Djangirov album), 2009
- Virtue (Emmy the Great album), 2011
- Virtue (Virtue album), 1997
- Virtue (The Voidz album), 2018
- Virtues (album), by Amber Pacific, 2010
- "Virtue", a song by Bloc Party, 2016
- "Virtue", a song by CeCe Peniston from Finally, 1992
- "Virtue", a song by Jim Guthrie from Morning Noon Night, 2002

== People ==
- Virtue (surname), a list of people with the name
- Virtue Hampton Whitted (1922–2007), American jazz singer and bassist

== Other uses ==
- Ethan Edwards, or Virtue, a Marvel Comics superhero
- Virtue (angel), a type of angel in the Christian angelic hierarchy
- Virtue (software), a VM virtual session manager
- Virtue Audio, an American manufacturer of integrated amplifiers
- Virtue Hills, a mountain range in Oregon, US
- Virtue, in role-playing games statistics, an advantageous character attribute

== See also ==
- Vertue, a surname
- Virtu (disambiguation)
- Virtus (disambiguation)
