= Binary Synchronous Communications =

IBM mainframe communications protocol

Binary Synchronous Communication (BSC or Bisync) is an IBM character-oriented, half-duplex link protocol, announced in 1967 after the introduction of System/360. It was used to send data over commercial telecommunications lines, providing framing, error correction and similar functions. It replaced the synchronous transmit-receive (STR) protocol used with second generation computers, and was itself replaced by SDLC as part of IBM's SNA networking systems in the 1970s.

A key aspect of the protocol was that it was character-oriented, meaning the various functions of the protocol were indicated by special characters in the data stream. Those characters were selected so that it could be used with three different character encodings for messages. Six-bit Transcode looked backward to older systems; USASCII with 128 characters and EBCDIC with 256 characters looked forward. Transcode disappeared very quickly but the EBCDIC and ASCII dialects of Bisync continued in use. Because the control characters, like SYN and ETX, could appear in the data itself, Bisync inserted DLE to escape these and provide "data transparency".

Bisync was found in a number of widely used IBM systems, like the IBM 2780 remote job entry system (punch cards), some IBM 3270 terminals, and connections to other computers like the System/360 and IBM 1103. This made it, for a time, the most widely used communications protocol. It is still in limited use in 2013.

== Basic concepts ==
Bisync is character-oriented, meaning the data inside are considered to be text, as opposed to binary data. This adds complexity as IBM has a number of different character sets being used and these have different byte sizes. For six-bit character sets, which were still common in the 1960s, IBM uses 6-bit Transcode as a lingua franca and applications are expected to convert to and from this format if needed. 7-bit ASCII is padded to 8-bit using odd parity, and 8-bit EBCDIC is sent as-is. This means that the data might be 6 or 8 bit depending on the source.

Bisync transmits data in blocks, whose content is defined by the application using it. Transfers are driven by the receiver, typically a mainframe or dedicated control system. The host machines can periodically poll the other devices using a Bisync packet asking for more data, and the devices will respond by either sending data or a message saying they had none.

A typical data block consisted of two SYN characters, an STX to indicate the start of the data section, a variable amount of data, an ETB (ASCII's ETX character) to indicate the end of the data, followed by the BCC checksum and finally a single "pad character" of 6 or 8-bits of all 1's. Bisync also allows a separate area in the block used to communicate settings and similar information, using the SOH instead of STX, with the STX indicating the end of the header and start of data, or an ETB indicating the end of the block (and thus no data). A receiver uses the checksum following the ETB, ETX or ITB to detect errors, and informs the sender using ACK or NAK messages. Errors are corrected by re-transmitting the packet.

The complete set of control characters and messages is:

BSC Link Control Characters
Char	EBCDIC (hexadecimal)	ASCII (hexadecimal)	Transcode (hexadecimal)	Description
SYN	32	16	3A	Synchronous idle
SOH	01	01	00	Start of heading
STX	02	02	0A	Start of text
ETB	26	17	0F	End of transmission block
ETX	03	03	2E	End of text
EOT	37	04	1E	End of transmission
ENQ	2D	05	2D	Enquiry
NAK	3D	15	3D	Negative acknowledgement
DLE	10	10	1F	Data link escape
ITB	1F	1F (US)	1D (US)	Intermediate block check character
ACK0	10 70	10 30	1F 2D	Even affirmative acknowledgement
ACK1	10 61	10 31	1F 54	Odd affirmative acknowledgement
WABT	10 7F	10 3F	1F 57	Wait before transmit

One curious feature is that Bisync used two ACK messages; ACK0 was used to acknowledge even-numbered packets and ACK1 for odd. This allowed the sender to determine if a packet had been dropped entirely by matching the ACK value to the low-bit of last sent packet number.

A typical connection and transfer using Bisync would include a series of messages, like this:

Action	Host	Device
Transmission initiated	SYN ... SYN ENQ pad	SYN ... SYN ACK0 pad
Transmit data block 1	SYN ... SYN STX text ... ETB BCC pad	SYN ... SYN ACK1 pad
Transmit data block 2	SYN ... SYN STX text ... ETB BCC pad	SYN ... SYN NAK pad
Retransmit data block 2	SYN ... SYN STX text ... ETB BCC pad	SYN ... SYN ACK0 pad
Transmit data block 3	SYN ... SYN STX text ... ETB BCC pad	SYN ... SYN ACK 1 pad
End transmission	SYN ... SYN EOT pad	Idle

The checksum, or "block check character" (BCC), came in three forms; the 8-bit longitudinal redundancy check (LRC) used with ASCII, a 16-bit cyclic redundancy check (CRC) for EBCDIC, and a 12-bit CRC for Transcode. The LRC was simply an XOR of the binary values, and the CRC was a two-byte value despite the "character" terminology for the BCC. If a block failed, it was up to the application to decide what to do, it could resend the block or simply fail out of the transfer.

One interesting feature of Bisync was the ability to insert a BCC at any point in the data, not just the end of the packet. This was indicated with the ITB character, followed by the BCC. This was added to allow the blocks to be any length that the application desired, but break up lengthy data into packet-like sections that could be individually re-sent to avoid having to sent the entire block again. So one could, for instance, send a large text file as a single block, and use ITB/BCC to break it down into packets.

Bisync blocks are similar to the ones in later file transfer protocols like XMODEM that emerged in the late 1970s. Both used lead-in characters to indicate the start of the packet, followed by data and then a checksum or CRC, as well as using ACK and NAK to indicate success or failure. They differ in that Bisync allows any amount of data in the packet, and this is up to the applications to decide, whereas file transfer protocols generally used fixed-size blocks that were determined during connection setup. Bisync is more complex than most of these systems, as it offers a variety of message formats to convey different information and control. (Note: Some later file protocols like ZMODEM and B protocol had many of these features as well.)

== Link control ==
Bisync was designed to work on half-duplex 2-wire systems. These were often commercial telephone wires, often using dedicated leased lines, which could have significant latency. In these setups, the time needed to return the ACK or NAK back to the sending side included a number of factors:

- the reversal of transmission direction,
- quiescing of line echo,
- resyncing.

These delays could be considerable, even on the order of the time needed to send the packet. Where additional speed was required, some datasets supported full-duplex operation on 4-wire systems. In this case, the ACK/NAKs were sent continually on the other pair of lines, reducing or eliminating the delays.

== Topology ==
Much Bisync traffic is point-to-point. Point-to-point lines can optionally use contention to determine the master station. In this case, one device can transmit ENQ to bid for control. The other device can reply ACK0 to accept the bid and prepare to receive, or NAK or WABT to refuse. In some cases connection of a terminal to multiple hosts is possible via the dial telephone network.

Multi-drop is part of the initial Bisync protocol. A master station, normally a computer, can sequentially poll terminals which are attached via analog bridges to the same communication line. This is accomplished by sending a message consisting only of an ENQ character addressed to each device in turn. The selected station then transmits a message to the master or reply with EOT to indicate that it has no data to transmit.

== Applications ==
The original purpose of Bisync was for batch communications between a System/360 mainframe and another mainframe or a Remote Job Entry (RJE) terminal such as the IBM 2780 or IBM 3780. The RJE terminals support a limited number of data formats: punched card images in and out and print line images to the terminal. Some non-IBM hardware vendors such as Mohawk Data Sciences used Bisync for other purposes such as tape-to-tape transmission. A programmer can easily emulate an RJE terminal or other device.

IBM introduced the 3270 display terminals in 1971. The 3271 Control Unit and 3275 Display Station provided BSC alternatives to the channel-attached 3272 local controller.

IBM offered assembler language macros to provide programming support. During the System/360 era, these access methods were initially BTAM (Basic Telecommunications Access Method) and QTAM (Queued Telecommunications Access Method) – which was later replaced by Telecommunications Access Method (TCAM). IBM introduced VTAM (Virtual Telecommunications Access Method) with the System/370.

Teleprocessing monitors such as IBM's CICS and third-party software such as Remote DUCS (display unit control system) and Westi platforms used Bisync line control to communicate with remote devices.

The academic computing network BITNET, together with connecting networks in other geographic areas, used Bisync to connect 3000 computer systems at its peak.

Financial network S.W.I.F.T. used BSC protocol for communication between Regional Center and Institution (bank) server over leased line. In a mid-1990 BSC was replaced by the X.25 infrastructure.

Some important systems use Bisync data framing with a different link control protocol. Houston Automatic Spooling Priority (HASP) uses Bisync half-duplex hardware in conjunction with its own link control protocol to provide full-duplex multi-datastream communication between a small computer and a mainframe running HASP. In Bisync terms, this is conversational mode.

Some early X.25 networks tolerated a connection scheme where transparent Bisync data frames encapsulated HDLC LAPB data and control packets. As of 2012, several vendors encapsulate Bisync transmissions within TCP/IP data streams.

== Disposition ==
Bisync began to be displaced in the 1970s by Systems Network Architecture (SNA) which allows construction of a network with multiple hosts and multiple programs using telecommunications. X.25 and the Internet Protocol are later protocols which, like SNA, provide more than mere link control.

== Devices ==
A large number of devices use the Bisync protocol, some of these are:

- IBM 3270 Display Terminal Subsystem control units.
- IBM 2780 Data Transmission Terminal.
- IBM 2703 Transmission Control.
- IBM HASP workstations.
- IBM 1130 Computing System.
- IBM 2922 Programmable Terminal.

== Comparable protocols ==
Other computer vendors offered their own variety of byte-oriented protocols similar to Bisync. Some widely used protocols include Digital Equipment Corporation's Digital Data Communications Message Protocol, and Burroughs Corporation's Poll and Select Protocol.

== See also ==
- Asynchronous communication
- Zilog SCC, a communications chip that included internal Bisync support
