= IBM Administrative Terminal System =

In 1983, the IBM Administrative Terminal System (ATS/360) provided text- and data-management tools for working with documents to users of IBM System/360 systems.

An earlier version ran on an IBM 1440 or IBM 1460 Data Processing System and the IBM Service Bureau Corporation offered a proprietary version, Call/ATS, which ran on IBM 1440 systems or on IBM System/360 DOS systems.

== Text and data management ==
ATS/360 provided comprehensive text- and data-management tools including entry, temporary storage, permanent storage, formatting, printing, archiving and retrieving. Utilizing ATS/360, a large business could maintain all its end-user documents, revising and printing new versions of these as required. Also using ATS/360, a large law practice could maintain its client files, including witness statements and depositions, and several landmark legal decisions were significantly assisted using ATS/360.

== Device support ==
Initially, ATS/360 supported only IBM 2741 typewriter terminals. Later, support was added by user groups for 2741 terminals with the "break feature" and for IBM 1050 terminals (that implicitly incorporated the "break feature"). The Magnetic Card Selectric Typewriter (MC/ST), which could emulate a 2741, was also supported.

ATS/360 was designed exclusively for IBM 2311 and IBM 2314 direct access storage facilities, for on-line "Working storage" and "Permanent storage" and for IBM 2400/3400 tape drives, for off-line "Rollout/Rollin" (Permanent storage backup/restore) and "Format and print" tapes.

An IBM hardware RPQ provided the IBM 1403 Model N1 printer's TN print train with characters which simulated the IBM Selectric typewriter Courier 72 type ball characters identically, thereby allowing machine printed documents to be manually corrected, or for manually inserted text, as required.

An IBM program RPQ added support for the IBM 3330 direct access storage facility, and this PRPQ was applied by most users of ATS/360 that had migrated to early IBM System/370 systems. Essentially, this PRPQ appended to selected instances of the canonical Load Halfword (LH) instruction—which implicitly featured "sign extension" from the source halfword's high-order bit, conceptually bit 15, to the remaining 16 bits of the destination general purpose register, conceptually bits 31 to 16—with a logical And (N) instruction, that specified a "mask" of 0x0000FFFF, and that eliminated the effect of the sign extension. This, then, allowed for 16-bit disk block addresses, that could later be converted to the expected and required CCHHR format. This PRPQ was also applicable to IBM 3350 direct access storage facilities that were operated in 3330 compatibility mode, and that sacrificed 117 MB of a native 3350's 317 MB total capacity in order to implement compatibility mode—two 100 MB 3330-equivalent drives on one 3350 drive).

== Operating system support ==
Support beyond OS/VS/2 Release 1 (SVS) was not offered by IBM, but Peter Haas, formerly with Litton Systems Inc, and subsequently with Amdahl Corp, added support for MVS in general, and for APs and MPs in particular, and a large number of ATS/360 systems thereby remained in use well into the MVS/370 era, until the 2741 terminals and the 3705/4705 controllers which supported these were removed from service.

== System design ==
ATS/360 was very efficient in its use of main storage, and it was not uncommon to support quite a few terminals in a minimum size partition or region. It was also very efficient in its use of system resources, and it had its own task dispatcher which worked seamlessly with PCP, MFT/MFT-II and MVT, for which it was originally designed, with SVS and, later, with Haas's support, with MVS.

ATS/360's input/output operations utilized EXCP exclusively. Task switching was accomplished asynchronously as an extension of ATS/360's EXCP appendages and synchronously as an extension of ATS/360's Type 1 Supervisor Call instruction (SVC 255), OS Nucleus control section IGC255. Thereby, ATS/360 could support quite a number of online (terminal) and offline (peripheral) tasks even on PCP, which otherwise supported just a single task. However, most ATS/360 systems were run in a partition of MFT/MFT-II or in a region of MVT, as the offline "format and print" tapes required a separate printer partition/region to physically print these, although the tapes, themselves, could be created under ATS/360, itself.

ATS/360 provided its own access methods and file formats. Offline "format and print" tapes could be printed using standard OS utilities as these tapes were compatible with BSAM, although these tapes were created using EXCP.

== ATMS ==
As a successor to ATS/360, IBM marketed ATMS supporting 3270 terminals, which ATS/360 did not. ATMS required the CICS data communications program product in addition to the ATMS program product, thereby requiring three program products, whereas ATS/360 itself was "free".
