= IBM MQ =

Family of message-oriented middleware products

IBM MQ is a family of message-oriented middleware products that IBM launched in December 1993. It was originally called MQSeries, and was renamed WebSphere MQ in 2002 to join the suite of WebSphere products. In April 2014, it was renamed IBM MQ. The products that are included in the MQ family are IBM MQ, IBM MQ Advanced, IBM MQ Appliance, IBM MQ for z/OS, and IBM MQ on IBM Cloud. IBM MQ also has containerised deployment options.

MQ allows independent and potentially non-concurrent applications on a distributed system to securely communicate with each other, using messages. MQ is available on a large number of platforms (both IBM and non-IBM), including z/OS (mainframe), IBM i, Transaction Processing Facility, UNIX (AIX, HP-UX, Solaris), HP NonStop, OpenVMS, Linux, and Microsoft Windows.

== MQ components ==
The core components of MQ are:

- Message: Messages are collections of binary or character (for instance ASCII or EBCDIC) data that have some meaning to a participating program. As in other communication protocols, storage, routing, and delivery information is added to the message before transmission and stripped from the message prior to delivery to the receiving application.
- Queue: Message queues are objects that store messages in an application.
- Queue Manager: a system service that provides a logical container for the message queue. It is responsible for transferring data to other queue managers via message channels. Although not strictly required for message-oriented middleware, is an IBM MQ prerequisite. Queue managers handle storage, timing issues, triggering, and all other functions not directly related to the actual movement of data.

Programs integrated with IBM MQ use a consistent application program interface (API) across all platforms.

== Messaging types ==
MQ supports point-to-point and publish–subscribe messaging.

== APIs ==
APIs directly supported by IBM include:

- IBM Message Queue Interface (MQI) for C, COBOL, PL/I, Java, Rexx, RPG, and C++
- Java Message Service (JMS)
- XMS for C/C++ and .NET
- .NET
- REST
- SOAP

IBM lists alternative protocols as "APIs" as well. These include:

- MQTT (integral part of the MQ Telemetry component)
- AMQP 1.0 (optional addition)

Additional APIs (not officially supported) are also available via third parties, including:

- Perl interface (developed and contributed by Hildo Biersma), available from CPAN.
- Python interface PyMQI (originally developed by Les Smithson), available from PyPI
- PowerShell

== Features ==
One-time delivery: MQ uses once and once only delivery. This quality of service typically prevents message loss or duplication.

Asynchronous messaging: MQ provides application designers with a mechanism to achieve non-time-dependent architecture. Messages can be sent from one application to another, regardless of whether the applications are running at the same time. If a message receiver application is not running when a sender sends it a message, the queue manager will hold the message until the receiver asks for it. Ordering of all messages is preserved, by default this is in FIFO order of receipt at the local queue within priority of the message.

Data transformation: e.g. Big Endian to Little Endian, or EBCDIC to ASCII. This is accomplished through the use of message data exits. Exits are compiled applications that run on the queue manager host, and are executed by the IBM MQ software at the time data transformation is needed.

Message-driven architecture framework: IBM MQ allows receipt of messages to "trigger" other applications to run.

Range of APIs: It implements the Java Message Service (JMS) standard API, and also has its own proprietary API, known as the Message Queuing Interface (MQI), which preceded the JMS several years in existence. As of version 8.0.0.4, MQ also supports the MQ Light API.

Clustering: Multiple MQ implementations share the processing of messages, providing load balancing.

== Communication ==
Queue managers communicate with the outside world either through:

- Bindings: a direct software connection. Generally faster, but limited to programs running on the same physical host as the queue manager.
- A network or "client" connection: applications using a client connection can connect to a queue manager on any other host in the network. The physical location of the queue manager is irrelevant, as long as it is reachable over the network. SNA APPC, TCP/IP, NetBIOS, and SPX may be used. There is also a MQ Internet Pass-Thru (MQIPT) for use over the TCP/IP Internet.

=== Communication between queue managers ===
This relies on a channel. Each queue manager uses one or more channels to send and receive data to other queue managers. A channel is uni-directional; a second channel is required to return data. In a TCP/IP based network, a channel sends or receives data on a specific port.

Channel types:

- Sending channel: has a defined destination and is associated with a specific transmission queue (the mechanism by which messages are queued awaiting transmission on the channel).
- Receiving channel: receives data from any other queue manager with a sending channel of the same name.

When a receiving channel receives a message, it is examined to see which queue manager and queue it is destined for. In the event of a communications failure, MQ can automatically re-establish a connection when the problem is resolved.

The listener is the application's network interface to the queue manager. The listener detects connections from incoming channels, and manages the connection of the sending channels to the receiving channels. In a TCP/IP network, the listener will "listen" for connections on a specific port.

=== Transmitting data to a queue on another queue manager ===
Queue types:

- Local queue: represents the location where data is stored awaiting processing.
- Remote queue: represents a queue on another queue manager. They define the destination queue, which is one element of the routing mechanism for messages.
- Cluster queue: represents a queue which is reachable via any queue manager in its cluster.

A message is placed on a remote queue. The messages goes to a temporary storage transmission queue associated with a channel. On placing a message on a remote queue, the message is transmitted across the remote channel. If the transmission is successful, the message is removed from the transmit queue. On receiving a message, the receiving queue manager examines the message to determine whether the message is for itself or if must go to another queue manager. If the receiving queue manager, the required queue will be checked, and if it exists, the message is placed on this queue. If not, the message is placed on the dead letter queue. MQ has features to manage efficient transmission of data across a variety of communication media. For example, messages can be batched together until a queue reaches a particular depth.

=== Ordering ===
Although the queue is FIFO, it is ordered based on the receipt in the local queue, not the committing of the message from the sender. Messages can be prioritized, and by default, the queue is prioritized in order of arrival. Queues will only be in sequence of addition if the message is added locally. Message grouping can be used to ensure a set of messages are in a specific order, aside from that, if sequence is critical, it is the application's responsibility to place sequence data in the message or implement a handshaking mechanism via a return queue. In reality, ordering will be maintained in straightforward configurations.

=== The log ===
The other element of a queue manager is the log. As a message is placed on a queue or a configuration change is made, the data is also logged. In the event of a failure, the log is used to recreate damaged objects and recreate messages. Only persistent messages are recreated when a failure occurs—"non-persistent" messages are lost. Non-persistent messages can be sent across a channel set to a fast mode, in which delivery is not assured in the event of a channel failure.

MQ supports both circular and linear logging.

=== Retrieving messages from queues ===
Information can be retrieved from queues either by polling the queue to check for available data at suitable intervals, or alternatively MQ can trigger an event, allowing a client application to respond to the delivery of a message.

== Availability ==
IBM MQ offers a variety of solutions to cater for availability:

Native HA (MQ Advanced on container platform like Red Hat OpenShift / CNFC Kubernetes and Red Hat Linux): It is a quorum-based architecture that requires one active node and two replica nodes. The logs are synchronously replicated between the nodes. It also provides Cross Region Replication feature that allows the Native HA cluster (in Live mode) to replicate asynchronously to another Native HA cluster (in Recovery mode).

Replicated Data Queue Manager (RDQM / 'Easy HA'- MQ Advanced on Red Hat Linux only): Synchronous replication between three servers that all share a floating IP address.

Queue Manager Clusters: Groups of two or more queue managers on one or more computers are defined to a cluster, providing automatic interconnection, and allow queues to be shared among them for load balancing and redundancy.

Queue Sharing Groups (z/OS only): In a Shared Queue environment, an application can connect to any of the queue managers within the queue-sharing group. Because all the queue managers in the queue-sharing group can access the same set of shared queues, the application does not depend on the availability of a particular queue manager. This gives greater availability if a queue manager stops because all the other queue managers in the queue-sharing group can continue processing the queue.

Multi-Instance Queue Managers (available from v7.0.1): Instances of the same queue manager are configured on two or more computers with their queues and meta data residing on shared storage. By starting multiple instances, one instance becomes the active instance and the other instances become standbys. If the active instance fails, a standby instance running on a different computer automatically takes over.

== History ==
=== Version release dates ===
Version name	Release date
IBM MQ 10.0 LTS	16 June 2026
IBM MQ 9.4 LTS	18 June 2024
IBM MQ 9.3 LTS	23 June 2022
IBM MQ 9.2 LTS	23 July 2020
IBM MQ 9.1 LTS	23 July 2018
IBM MQ on IBM Cloud	13 March 2018
IBM MQ for HPE Nonstop 8.0	23 June 2017
IBM MQ 9.0 LTS	2 June 2016
IBM MQ 8.0	23 May 2014
WebSphere MQ 7.5	15 June 2012
WebSphere MQ 7.1	November 2011
WebSphere MQ 7.0 z/OS	June 2008
WebSphere MQ 7.0 (Distributed, iSeries)	May 2008
WebSphere MQ 6.0 z/OS	June 2005
WebSphere MQ 6.0 (Distributed, iSeries)	May 2005
WebSphere MQ 5.3 z/OS	June 2002
WebSphere MQ 5.3 (Distributed, iSeries)	June, July, Oct, Nov 2002
MQSeries 5.2 (Distributed)	Dec 2000
MQSeries for OS/390 V5.2	Nov 2000
MQSeries for AS/400 V5.1	July-Aug 2000
MQSeries for OS/390 V2.1	Feb 1999
MQSeries 5.1	April (NT), June 1999
MQSeries for AS/400 V4.2	Feb 1998
MQSeries 5.0	October 1997
MQSeries for MVS/ESA 1.2	29 August 1997
MQSeries for MVS 1.1.4,	June 1996
MQSeries 2.2 (Sun OS/Solaris, DC/OSx)	June, July 1996
MQSeries 2.0 Windows NT	2Q 1996
MQSeries 2.2 (HP, SCO)	4Q 1995
MQSeries for MVS 1.1.3	May 1995
MQSeries 2.0 (OS/2, AIX)	Feb 1995 (the beginning of the end of ezBridge)
MQM/400 V3	4Q 1994
ezBridge Transact for MQSeries 3.0	July 1994
MQSeries for MVS 1.1.2	June 1994
MQM/400 V2.3	Feb/April 1994
ezBridge Transact for MQSeries	March, Sept, Nov, Dec 1993 (different platforms)
MQSeries for MVS V1.1.1	December 31, 1993

=== Version end of support dates ===
The following table applies to MQ software. The MQ Appliance has different lifecycle dates for both firmware and hardware than those in the table.

Version name	General availability	End of marketing	End of support
IBM MQ 10.0	16 June 2026	-	-
IBM MQ 9.4	18 June 2024	-	-
IBM MQ 9.3	23 June 2022	-	30 Sep 2027
IBM MQ 9.2	23 July 2020	-	30 Sep 2025
IBM MQ 9.1	23-Jul-2018	15-Sep-2023	30-Sep-2023
IBM MQ 9.0	02-Jun-2016	17-Sep-2021	30-Sep-2021
IBM MQ 8.0	13-Jun-2014	17-Apr-2020	30-Apr-2020
WebSphere MQ 7.5	06-Jul-2012	16-Dec-2016	30-Apr-2018
WebSphere MQ 7.1	25-Nov-2011	12-Jul-2016	30-Apr-2017

=== Background architectural reference ===
With the advent of computers, IBM saw an opportunity to apply new technology to the need for message switching.

In the early 1960s, IBM marketed the IBM 7740 Communication Control System and the IBM 7750 Programmed Transmission Control, which were programmable message switching systems.

The IBM System/360 was announced in April 1964 and with it came communication access methods such as BTAM and QTAM (Basic and Queued Telecommunications Access Methods). In 1971, TCAM, the Telecommunications Access Method, offered its users a more advanced form of message switching or message routing. TCAM was widely accepted, especially in the financial and brokerage industries. It supported asynchronous messaging, as with the later MQ. TCAM 3.0 added in reusable disk message queues for recovery soon thereafter, as with MQ. A high-level PL/I program could be used to access TRANSIENT datasets (dynamic message queues). Reading a message from a transient dataset resulted in that message being removed from the queue, as with a non-browse READ with MQ.

In the late 1970s, transaction management systems came into being, each trying to achieve a leadership position in the industry. Within IBM, CICS and IMS were chosen as strategic products to address the need for transaction management. Within both CICS and IMS, each had its version of message switching, IMS being a front-end queued system and CICS having its Transient Data facility as the possible basis for message switching.

CICS established itself as a popular transaction management system in the 1968-1971 timeframe. Those users who had adopted TCAM for its message handling capabilities now wanted a combined use of TCAM with CICS. In December 1971, IBM announced CICS support of TCAM as part of the CICS/OS-Standard product, to be delivered in December 1972. For interested customers, this enabled them to use TCAM for its message handling strengths and also have TCAM-connected terminals or computers interface with CICS online applications.

In January 1973, TCAM continued to be supported by CICS/OS-Standard Version 2.3. However, TCAM support was omitted from the initial release of CICS/VS, announced in February 1973 and delivered in June 1974. Needless to say, many CICS-TCAM customers were not happy with that product direction.

With considerable pressure from CICS-TCAM customers, the CICS support of TCAM was reinstated in the CICS/VS 1.1 product, as of September 1974. In addition to the previous DCB support, with this reinstatement of TCAM support, CICS began to support TCAM access via VTAM, also known as the ACB support. CICS TCAM ACB support was discontinued as of the CICS/ESA Version 3 product in 1990.

In 1992, IBM announced a new product called MQSeries. This brand name was later renamed to WebSphere MQ (however its official short name remained MQ) in 2002 to support the WebSphere family name and the product. In 2014, it was renamed IBM MQ. MQ was to be the extension of TCAM functionality from IBM-only systems to all other platforms. MQ has an architecture that enables heterogeneous systems to communicate with each other (e.g. IBM, HP, Sun, Tandem, etc.). MQ can be used with CICS systems to send and receive data to/from any other MQ-eligible system. MQ can be used to initiate work in a CICS system or a CICS transaction can initiate work in another CICS or non-CICS system.

IBM MQ now supports 80 different environments and has become the leading message assured delivery switching/routing product in the industry.

== MQ and web services ==
IBM MQ can be used as a foundation for creating service-oriented architectures. Several additional product options exist to help convert legacy programs into functioning web services through the use of MQ. Larger, heterogeneous enterprises often appear as a federation of somewhat autonomous domains based on lines of business, functional or governance areas. In such environments, some services may be shared or reused only within a single domain, while others may be shared or reused throughout the enterprise. IBM MQ provides the means by which communication exists between lines-of-business or otherwise separate business domains.

A related product in the IBM MQ product family, called IBM App Connect Enterprise (formerly IBM Integration Bus / WebSphere Message Broker) enables a diverse and robust set of extensions to queue-based architectures. Using IBM Integration Bus, users can implement a WebServices front-end, complete with WSDL file support that can interact with any queue-based application.

== See also ==
- Advanced Message Queuing Protocol
- IBM WebSphere Message Broker
- Java Message Service
- Message queue
- Message Queuing as a Service
- MQTT
