= IBM MTCS =

MTCS (Minimum Teleprocessing Communications System) was a transaction processor that ran on IBM mainframe systems under OS/VS1 and DOS/VS.

MTCS was available from IBM and designed for rapid, low to medium-volume online processing. This process was entirely interactive (screen-oriented using 3270 display terminals).

The 'official' version of MTCS was a single thread only and was a forerunner of CICS before it was released. An unofficial and multi-threaded version of MTCS was developed by Littlewoods Pools, UK at the same time as a multi-threaded "MTCS bridge" (middleware MTCS simulator) became available for running MTCS transactions directly under CICS. This version was also used by other customers including Granada Productions under a license agreement.

== Transactions ==
An MTCS transaction is a set of operations which together perform a task. Usually, the majority of transactions are relatively simple tasks such as updating the balance of an account.

MTCS applications comprise transactions which were written in IBM Basic Assembly Language and interfaced with 3270 terminals.

Each MTCS program was initiated using a transaction identifier. MTCS screens were sent as native 3270 datastreams to the terminal.

== History ==
The first release of MTCS was made available prior to the first release of CICS in the late 1960s. A forerunner of MTCS was known as "FASTER" and was a higher level BTAM based product that controlled IBM 2260 display terminals

== See also ==
- IBM 3270
- CICS: a later teleprocessing monitor from IBM
