= IBM remote batch terminals =

IBM remote job entry devices

The IBM 2780 and the IBM 3780 are devices developed by IBM for performing remote job entry (RJE) and other batch functions over telephone (Note: They used different adapters for dial and leased lines.) lines; they communicate with the mainframe via Binary Synchronous Communications (BSC or Bisync) and replaced older terminals using synchronous transmit-receive (STR). In addition, IBM has developed workstation programs for the 1130, 360/20, 2922, System/360 other than 360/20, System/370 and System/3.

== 2780 Data Transmission Terminal ==
The 2780 Data Transmission Terminal first shipped in 1967. It consists of:

- A line printer similar to the IBM 1443 that can print up to 240 lines per minute (lpm), or 300 lpm using an extremely restricted character set.
- A card reader/punch unit, similar to an IBM 1442, that can read up to 400 cards per minute (cpm) and can punch up to 355 cpm.
- A line buffer that stores data received or to be transmitted over the communications line.
- A binary synchronous adapter which controls the flow of data over the communications line.

The 2780 is capable of local (offline) card to print operation.

It comes in four models:

- Model 1: Can read punched cards and transmit the data to a remote host computer, and can receive and print data sent by the host.
- Model 2: Same as Model 1 but adds the ability to punch card data received from the host.
- Model 3: Can only print data received from the host, but not send data to it.
- Model 4: Can read and punch card data, but has no printing capabilities.

The 2780 uses a dedicated communication line at speeds of 1200, 2000, 2400 or 4800 bits per second. It is a half duplex device, although full duplex lines can be used with some increase in throughput. It can communicate in Transcode (a 6-bit code), 8-bit EBCDIC, or 7-bit ASCII.

== 2770 Data Communication System ==
The 2770, announced in 1969, "was said to surpass all other IBM terminals in the variety of available input-output devices." The 2770 was developed by the IBM General Products Division (GPD) in Rochester, MN.

It comes standard with a desktop terminal with keyboard. The printer and other devices (any two in any combination) can be attached to the 2772 Multi-Purpose Control unit. Possible devices include:

- 50 Magnetic Data Inscriber
- 545 Card Punch Model 3 (non-printing) or Model 4 (printing)
- 1017 Paper Tape Reader
- 1018 Paper Tape Punch
- 1053 Printer Model 1
- 1255 Magnetic Character Reader Models 1, 2 or 3
- 2203 Printer Model A1 or A2
- 2213 Printer Model 1 or 2
- 2265 Display Station Model 2
- 2502 Card Reader Model A1 or A2
- 5496 Data Recorder

== 3780 Data Communications Terminal ==
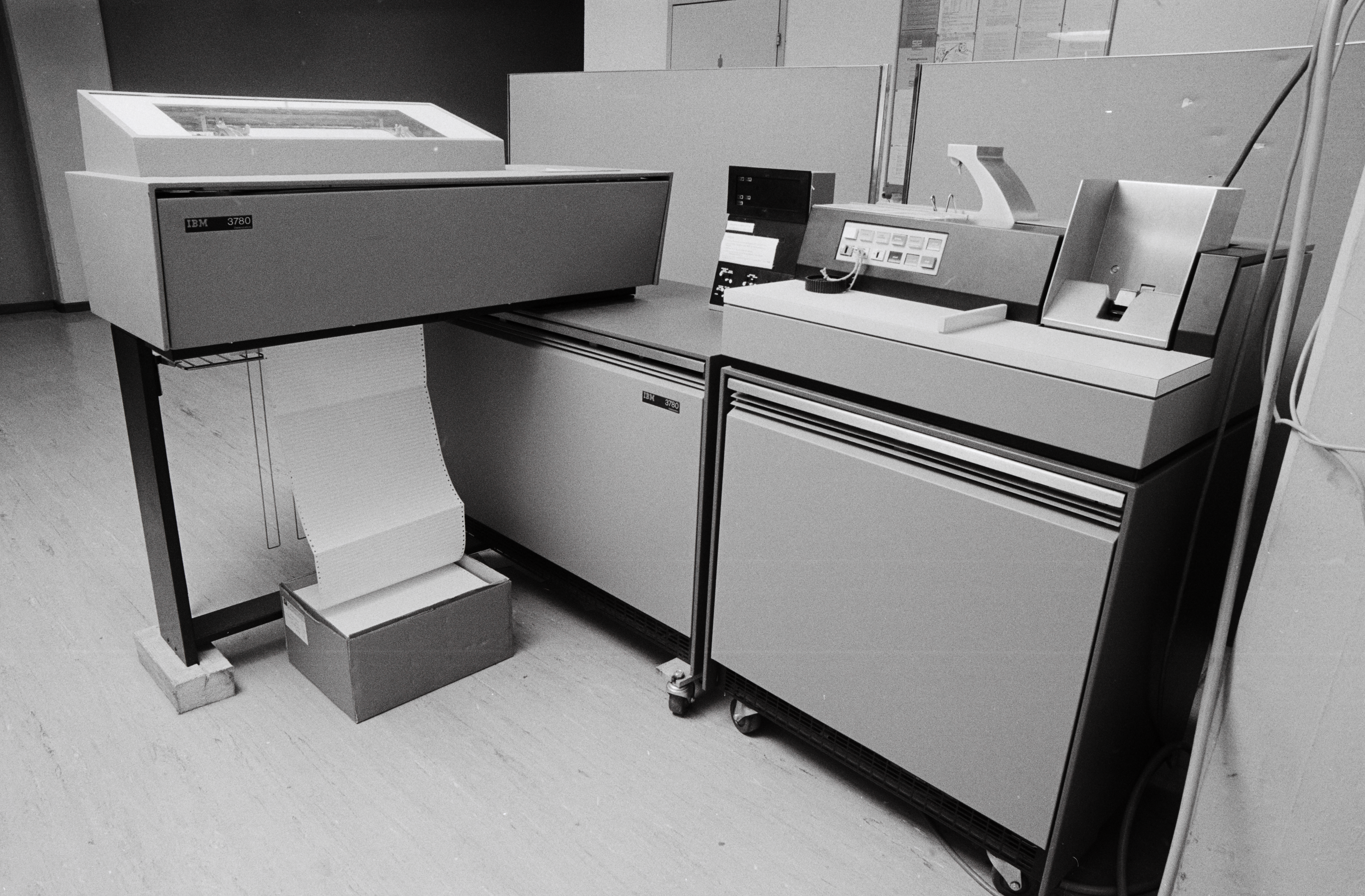
IBM 3780 Data Communications System

In May 1972, IBM announced the IBM 3780, an enhanced version of the 2780. The 3780 was developed by IBM's Data Processing Division (DPD). There is one model, with an optional card punch.

The 3780 drops Transcode support and incorporates several performance enhancements. It supports compression of blank fields in data using run-length encoding. It provides the ability to interleave data between devices, introduces double buffering, and adds support for the Wait-before-transmit ACKnowledgement (WACK) and Temporary Text Delay (TTD) Binary Synchronous control characters.

- The integrated punched card unit can read cards at 600 cards per minute.
- The integrated printer is rated at 300, 350 or 425 lines per minute based on characters set (63, 52 or 39 characters).
- The 3781 Card Punch is an optional feature. It punches 160 columns per second, or 91 cards per minute if all 80 columns are punched.

The IBM 2780 and 3780 were later emulated on various types of equipment, including eventually the personal computer. A notable early emulation was the DN60, by Digital Equipment Corporation in the late 1970s.

== 3770 Data Communications System ==
In 1974 IBM Data Processing Division (DPD) offered a successor to the 3780, called the 3770 Data Communications System, supporting SDLC, BSC, BSC Multi-leaving and SNA, depending on the configuration. The 3770 is a family of desk console style terminals that offers a variety of keyboard and printer combinations as well as I/O equipment attachment and communications features.

The terminals come built into a desk and include the following models:

- 3771 Communication Terminal (optional card reader, optional card punch, wire matrix printer) Models 1 (40 cps printer), 2 (80 cps printer), and 3 (120 cps printer).
- 3773 Communication Terminal (diskette, wire matrix printer) Models 1 (40 cps printer), 2 (80 cps printer), and 3 (120 cps printer). Each model has a P version which adds some programming features.
- 3774 Communication Terminal (optional card reader, optional card punch, optional belt printer, wire matrix printer) Models 1 (80 cps printer), and 2 (120 cps printer). Each model has a P version which adds some programming features, a 480-character display and a non-removable diskette.
- 3775 Communication Terminal (optional card reader, optional card punch, optional diskette, belt printer) Model 1 (120 lpm printer). The model P1 adds some programming features, a 480-character display and a non-removable diskette.
- 3776 Communication Terminal (optional card reader, optional card punch, optional diskette, belt printer) Models 1 (300 lpm printer) and 2 (400 lpm printer). Models 3 and 4 are similar to models 1 and 2.
- 3777 Communication Terminal (optional card reader, optional diskette, train printer) Model 1 (up to 1000 lpm printer depending on character set). Model 2 adds an optional card punch, model 3 adds an optional magnetic tape drive and model 4 replaces the train printer with a slower model called the IBM 3262. The model 4 also allows a second, optional, 3262.

The following I/O devices can be attached to a 3770 terminal:

- IBM 2502 Card Reader: Models A1 (up to 150 card per minute), A2 (up to 300 cards per minute) or A3 (up to 400 cards per minute)
- IBM 3203 Printer Model 3: 1000 LPM using 48 character set
- IBM 3501 Card Reader: Up to 50 cards per minute desktop unit
- IBM 3521 Card Punch: Up to 50 cards per minute
- IBM 3782 Card Attachment unit, which allows the 2502 or 3521 to be attached to any terminal except the 3777
- IBM 3784 Line Printer, can be attached to a 3774 as a second printer. Up to 155 LPM with 48 characters set print belt.

== Workstation programs ==
IBM distributes workstation programs with systems software including

- OS/360
- Attached Support Processor (ASP)
- Houston Automatic Spooling Priority (HASP and HASP II)
- Operating System/Virtual Storage 1 (OS/VS1)
- Operating System/Virtual Storage 2 (OS/VS2 MVS) Release 2 through 3.8
- MVS versions from MVS/SP Version 1 through z/OS
- Priority Output Writers, Execution processors and input Readers (POWER)
- Remote Spooling Communications Subsystem (RSCS)

Except for the RJE workstation programs in OS/360, these programs use a variation of BSC known as Multi-leaving. In addition, IBM provides separately ordered workstation programs using BSC. Systems Network Architecture (SNA) and TCP/IP.

Workstation programs are available from IBM and third-party vendors to support all of these protocols:

- 2770/3770
- 2780/3780
- Multileaving
- Network Job Entry (NJE)
- OS/360 RJE
- SNA
- TCP/IP

== External References ==
- Component Description: IBM 2780 Data Transmission Terminal (PDF) (Fourth ed.). IBM. August 1971. GA27-3005-3.
- IBM Corporation (1975). Component information for the IBM 3780 data communication terminal (GA27-3063).
- Component Description for the IBM 3776 and 3777 Communication Terminals (PDF) (Third ed.). January 1981. GA27-3145-2. Archived from the original (PDF) on 2021-12-19.
- "BiSync, BSC". Made IT.
- General Information - Binary Synchronous Communicatioms (PDF). A27-3004-0.
- Images of 2780 and 3780
