= WDU =

WDU may refer to one of several things:

- WDU (software), a DOS mainframe disc utility
- Wadjigu language has the ISO-639 code wdu
- Wellington Diamond United, a former New Zealand soccer club
- West Dulwich railway station, in England, has the railcode WDU
- West Dunbartonshire, Scotland, has the ISO code WDU
- Western Delta University in Nigeria
- Workers Defense Union (1918-1923), a radical legal defense organization in the United States
- Waste disposal unit, UK name for garbage disposal unit
