= IBM 1017 =

The IBM 1017 is a table-top paper tape reader from IBM introduced in 1968.

The 1017 reads 5, 6, 7, and 8-track paper or polyester tape at 120 characters-per-second (cps). Two models were available, the model 1 reads strips of tape, while the model 2 has supply and take-up reels, and can read either strips or reels.

== IBM 1018 ==
The IBM 1018 is a paper tape punch from IBM introduced in 1968.

The 1018 punches paper or polyester tape at 120 cps.

== Attachment ==
The 1017 and 1018 can attach to the multiplexor channel of an IBM System/360 Model 25, Model 30, Model 40, or Model 50, via an IBM 2826 control unit. They also attach to an 2770 Data Communication System.

The 1017 and 1018 are supported by DOS/360.
