= TCAM =

TCAM may refer to:

- Telecommunications Access Method
- Ternary content-addressable memory
- Telecommunications Conformity Assessment and Market Surveillance Committee
- Traditional, Complementary and Alternative medicine
- Transport Chemical Aerosol Model
