= Transcode (disambiguation) =

Transcode is a direct digital-to-digital data conversion process.

Transcode may also refer to:

- Transcode (character encoding), an IBM 6-bit data transmission code
- Base station subsystem § Transcoder
