= IBM POWER =

IBM POWER (or IBM Power) may refer to:

- IBM POWER (software), an IBM operating system enhancement package
- IBM POWER architecture, a predecessor to the PowerPC/Power ISA instruction set architecture
- IBM Power microprocessors, a line of microprocessors implementing the IBM POWER and the PowerPC/Power ISA instruction set architectures
- IBM Power Systems, a family of server computers
