= Westi =

Local teleprocessing packages for IBM's DOS/VSE environment

Westi (Westinghouse Teleprocessing Interface System) was one of two early local teleprocessing packages for IBM's DOS/VSE environment. Westi stood for Westinghouse Terminal Interactive. Westi provided an interface and access method for programmers to 'talk' to monitors and handle data entry. Such access methods later became known as APIs and the handlers a form of transaction processing.

In 1981, WESTI was considered the main competitor to CICS, holding second place in market share for IBM mainframe transaction processing monitors.

Initially written for the IBM 2260 running under DOS on IBM mainframes, the original product was offered free for IBM users. With the advent of DOS/VS and the IBM 3270 series terminals, Westinghouse realized they could recover part of their development costs and commercialized the product, circa 1970. The company added transparent remote access about 1980.

Westi consumed less memory than CICS, which was attractive in the highly memory-constrained computing environments of the 1970s, in which 256KB was considered a large amount of memory.

Westi operated as an application's mainline program and, like IBM's soon to follow CICS, programmers wrote subroutines to read and write data to and from terminals and discs. This real time paradigm became known as transaction processing.

This differed from Westi's primary competitor, DUCS, which reversed that model in that it was a subroutine package that read from and wrote to monitors. While Westi was not as easy to program and use as DUCS, Westi (like CICS) handled task management.

In terms of speed, Westi fell between DUCS and the considerably more process-bound CICS.

== Development ==
=== Pittsburgh ===
Steve Robert O'Donnell wrote the original DOS 2260 package, which was distributed free of charge. Its popularity made Westinghouse realize Westi had potential as a commercial product.

=== Columbus ===
In 1972, IBM released DOS/VS with the IBM/370 and the first IBM 3270 terminals, and the Westinghouse Software group began a rewrite for new products. Several new team members were assigned, including John Gaston, who took over lead development following the departure of Steve O'Donnell in the latter 1970s. (Steve O'Donnell went on to found GOAL Systems, Inc.)

=== Paris ===
Westinghouse Marketing suffered a schism about the same time, and the result was that Europe established an independent subsidiary, Westinghouse Electric Management Systems, SA, or WEMSSA, headquartered in Paris. At that point, the Westinghouse product line, WDU and WESTI, bifurcated, taking independent development paths.

=== Orlando ===
The original development team moved to Orlando, Florida, where it eventually came under the management of Dr. Ray Ferguson and focused on integration with VSE and matching features with CICS.

=== Avignon ===
WEMSSA, under the direction of Eric Lutaud, contracted with GOAL Systems and eventually developer Leigh Lundin (author of DUCS Remote) for development, which focused on adding remote teleprocessing in Avignon, France. The result was WestiTAM, a 4k bi-sync module, which the Florida group expressed an interest in.

In 1978, WEMSSA resumed relations with the Florida group and eventually the two merged, coming under the new director of WEMSSA in London, David Hazlewood. Westinghouse committed to remerging the product line, re-engineering new products under the direction of Dr. Ferguson and Leigh Lundin. However, part way into development, Westinghouse began to break up the division during the outsourcing thrust of the Reaganomics era. Through badly managed negotiations, Westinghouse ended up with neither developers or outsourcing partners, which spelled the end for one of the industries foremost software groups.

== Marketing ==
Westinghouse Electric Management Systems, SA (WEMSSA), had sales offices in Pittsburgh, San Jose, Paris, Lyon, London, Geneva, Zürich, Munich, and Amsterdam. Development offices were in Orlando, with further development in Columbus, Ohio and Avignon, France.
