= WMQ =

WMQ may refer to:

- The William and Mary Quarterly, a quarterly history journal in the United States
- IBM WebSphere MQ, a family of network communication software products launched by IBM
