= Virtus (disambiguation) =

Virtus is an ancient Roman virtue.

Virtus may also refer to:

- Virtus (deity), an ancient Roman deity personifying virtus
- The Seal of Virginia that has a female personification of the virtue of virtus
- Virtus Pallacanestro Bologna, an Italian basketball club
- Virtus Investment Partners, a publicly traded investment manager in Hartford, Connecticut, United States
- Virtus Roma, an Italian basketball club
- Virtus Rieti, an Italian basketball club
- Virtus Casarano, an Italian football club
- Virtus Entella, an Italian football club
- Virtus Verona, an Italian football club
- Bassano Virtus 55 S.T., an Italian football club
- S.S. Virtus Lanciano 1924, an Italian football club
- Virtus (program), a program of the Roman Catholic Church in the U.S.
- S.S. Virtus, Sammarinese football team
- 494 Virtus, a minor planet
- Conroy Virtus, a proposed American giant aircraft
- Volkswagen Virtus, a subcompact sedan/saloon
- Virtus, Burgos, a village in the Spanish province of Burgos

== See also ==
- Virtue (disambiguation)
