= Poison message =

Computing issue where sending a message fails too many times

A poison message refers to a client–server model issue, where a client machine tries to send a message to the server and fails too many times (the actual amount of "too many" is variable).

The behavior toward poison messages varies - they are either discarded, create a service request event, or initiate other failure indications. The term is used mainly in Microsoft-related frameworks, like SQL Server or Windows Communication Foundation (WCF). RabbitMQ also has a notion of poisoned messages.

== See also ==
- Dead letter queue
- Microsoft Message Queuing
