= Grasp (spooler) =

The "GRASP" button, installed on an IBM 370/E that provided an interrupt into the F0 partition.

GRASP was a systems software package that provided spooling facilities for IBM mainframes: the IBM/370 running DOS/VS or DOS/VSE environment, and IBM/360 running DOS/360.

== Overview ==
GRASP was a mainframe operating system enhancement available for DOS/360, DOS/VS, DOS/VSE, and some third-party compatible operating systems. Subsequent versions became known as GRASP/VS and GRASP/VSE.

It spooled (queued) input and output data, freeing programs from dependence on the speed of peripherals, such as printers and punched card equipment. GRASP was the first such spooler for IBM mainframes, although it later had competition from IBM's own POWER as well as DataCorp's Spooler.

GRASP manages both SYSIN (system input) and SYSOUT (system output) datasets. These are spooled datasets stored on direct-access storage devices (DASD), allowing input and output to be processed independently of the speed of physical devices such as card readers, printers, and card punches.

== SYSIN and SYSOUT ==
SYSIN datasets contain spooled system input. Under DOS itself there is no native spooling support, so GRASP provides the system reader functions that queue input, typically from card readers, although magnetic tape can also be used. Many application programs conventionally expect their primary input on the ddname SYSIN. The term SYSIN is also used in OS JCL for the DD * and DD DATA statements, although those facilities are outside the DOS environment.

SYSOUT datasets contain spooled system output. GRASP queues output destined for printers, punched card equipment, or magnetic tape, allowing programs to complete without waiting for slow peripheral devices. Output datasets are subsequently processed by output writers.

IBM later introduced similar facilities in POWER, which became the standard spooler for DOS/VS and DOS/VSE systems.

== Platforms ==
GRASP ran on the IBM/360 and IBM/370 and clones under DOS/VS, DOS/VSE, and DOS/360.

GRASP required a dedicated partition. With DOS having only three partitions and DOS/VS seven, losing a partition restricted what the mainframe could run. However, the concept of the F0 partition meant this could run without the host computer giving up a partition. For DOS/VS and DOS/VSE versions, SDI re-engineered a version of Fx developed for DOCS and Spooler.

== History ==
GRASP was originally developed in Australia by Boyd Munro while working for IBM, which declined to market it. Assisted by Peter Hargrave, Munro formed Software Design, Inc. (SDI) and began selling it first in Australia, then Britain, and shortly thereafter the United States through SDI, Inc., a California corporation. The marketing manager and chief salesman was Gerry Novotny.
