= IBM 1070 =

IBM 1070 Process Communication System was IBM's communication system with analog-to-digital and digital-to-analog conversion functions that was announced in 1964 for the process industries (oil refinery, iron & steel, pharmaceutical and other industries).

== Configuration ==
The 1070 System could be configured from:

- IBM 1026: IBM 1030/1050/1060/1070 Transmission Control Unit
- IBM 1071: Terminal Control Unit
- IBM 1072: Terminal Multiplexer
- IBM 1073: Latching Contact Operate Model 1
- IBM 1073: Counter Terminal Model 2
- IBM 1073: Digital-Pulse Converter Model 3
- IBM 1074: Binary Display
- IBM 1075: Decimal Display
- IBM 1076: Manual Binary Input
- IBM 1077: Manual Decimal Input
- IBM 1078: Pulse Counter

On the IBM System/360 or System/370 computer side, attachment was done through IBM 2701 Data Adapter Unit, 2702 Data Communications Unit, or other remote communications units.

The 1070 System was announced in April 1964, at the same time as the IBM System/360 announcement, and became available in the following year.

== See also ==
- Process industry
