= Virtue (surname) =

Virtue is the surname of:

- Brock Virtue (born 1986), Canadian curler
- Doreen Virtue (born 1958), American New Age author
- Erin Virtue (born 1983), American volleyball coach
- Frank Virtue (1927–1994), American guitarist
- Frederic Virtue (1896–1985), British boxer
- George Virtue (1794–1868), London publisher
- Hayden Virtue, Australian canoer
- Jake Virtue (1865–1943), American Major League Baseball player
- James Sprent Virtue (1829–1892), British publisher, son of George Virtue
- John Virtue (born 1947), English artist
- Keith Virtue (1909–1980), Australian pioneer aviator
- Keith Virtue (footballer) (1917–1976), Australian rules footballer
- Matty Virtue (born 1997), English footballer
- Mickey Virtue, member of the British reggae/pop band UB40
- Tarita Virtue (born 1970), successful actress and model
- Terry Virtue (born 1970), Canadian ice hockey player
- Tessa Virtue (born 1989), Canadian ice dancer, 3 Olympic gold medals and 2 Olympic silver medals
- Tom Virtue (born 1957), American actor
- Vivian Virtue (1911–1998), Jamaican poet

== See also ==
- Vertue
