= Transcode (character encoding) =

IBM 6-bit data transmission code

Six-Bit Transcode, or Six-Bit Transmission Code, was, for a few years, one of the three character sets used by IBM for Binary Synchronous Communications. Transmission using 6-bit Transcode had higher throughput than transmission using 8-bit EBCDIC or ASCII, provided that the data to be transmitted used a limited set of 48 characters.

The IBM 2780 data transmission terminal was announced with Transcode support in 1967. Its successor, the IBM 3780 data communication terminal, announced in 1972, dropped Transcode support and added a "space compression" option.

Transcode is a six-bit character code. It relates to IBM's punched card code but, like EBCDIC, it is not BCD. Its 64 values consist of the 26 uppercase letters, 10 numbers, 11 symbols, space, and 16 control characters. Its 48 printable characters are ABCDEFGHIJKLMNOPQRSTUVWXYZ0123456789 .'-/@#$%&*⌑; it cannot represent ,:;!?"()[]<>+^=_\`{}|~. Characters are transmitted with odd parity. The 2780 cannot use the 16 control characters as data characters in Transcode mode.

== Code table ==
Six-Bit Transcode
	0	1	2	3	4	5	6	7	8	9	A	B	C	D	E	F
0x	SOH	A	B	C	D	E	F	G	H	I	STX	.	⌑	BEL	SUB	ETB
1x	&	J	K	L	M	N	O	P	Q	R	SP	$	*	IUS/ ITB	EOT	DLE
2x	-	/	S	T	U	V	W	X	Y	Z	ESC	'	%	ENQ	ETX	HT
3x	0	1	2	3	4	5	6	7	8	9	SYN	#	@	NAK	EM	DEL

== Code table (from 2780 manual) ==
Character	Punched card code	6-bit transcode	Hex
SOH	12-9-1	P	00
A	12-1	5	01
B	12-2	4	02
C	12-3	4 5 P	03
D	12-4	3	04
E	12-5	3 5 P	05
F	12-6	3 4 P	06
G	12-7	3 4 5	07
H	12-8	2	08
I	12-9	2 5 P	09
STX	12-9-2	2 4 P	0A
.	12-8-3	2 4 5	0B
⌑	12-8-4	2 3 P	0C
BEL	0-9-8-7	2 3 5	0D
Sub	9-8-7	2 3 4	0E
ETB	0-9-6	2 3 4 5 P	0F
&	12	1	10
J	11-1	1 5 P	11
K	11-2	1 4 P	12
L	11-3	1 4 5	13
M	11-4	1 3 P	14
N	11-5	1 3 5	15
O	11-6	1 3 4	16
P	11-7	1 3 4 5 P	17
Q	11-8	1 2 P	18
R	11-9	1 2 5	19
Space	no punch	1 2 4	1A
$	11-8-3	1 2 4 5 P	1B
*	11-8-4	1 2 3	1C
US	11-9-8-7	1 2 3 5 P	1D
EOT	9-7	1 2 3 4 P	1E
DLE	12-11-9-8-1	1 2 3 4 5	1F
-	11	0	20
/	0-1	0 5 P	21
S	0-2	0 4 P	22
T	0-3	0 4 5	23
U	0-4	0 3 P	24
V	0-5	0 3 5	25
W	0-6	0 3 4	26
X	0-7	0 3 4 5 P	27
Y	0-8	0 2 P	28
Z	0-9	0 2 5	29
ESC	0-9-7	0 2 4	2A
'	0-8-3	0 2 4 5 P	2B
%	0-8-4	0 2 3	2C
ENQ	0-9-8-5	0 2 3 5 P	2D
ETX	12-9-3	0 2 3 4 P	2E
HT	12-9-5	0 2 3 4 5	2F
0	0	0 1 P	30
1	1	0 1 5	31
2	2	0 1 4	32
3	3	0 1 4 5 P	33
4	4	0 1 3	34
5	5	0 1 3 5 P	35
6	6	0 1 3 4 P	36
7	7	0 1 3 4 5	37
8	8	0 1 2	38
9	9	0 1 2 5 P	39
SYN	9-2	0 1 2 4 P	3A
#	8-3	0 1 2 4 5	3B
@	8-4	0 1 2 3 P	3C
NAK	9-8-5	0 1 2 3 5	3D
EM	11-9-8-1	0 1 2 3 4	3E
DEL	12-9-7	0 1 2 3 4 5 P	3F

== Devices using Transcode ==
- IBM 2701 Data Adapter Unit
- IBM 2703 Transmission Control
- IBM 2780 Data Transmission Terminal
- IBM System/370 model 135 Integrated Communications Adapter (ICA)
