= IBM 7701 =

The IBM 7701 Magnetic Tape Transmission Terminal was a communications device announced by IBM in 1960. It was designed to transfer the contents of a reel of magnetic tape over a leased or dial telephone circuit.

The IBM 7702 was a similar device that could communicate at higher speeds.

The 7701 was the first product introduced in conjunction with IBM's TELE-PROCESSING trademark.

== Technical details ==
The 7701 communicated using the Synchronous transmit-receive (STR) communications protocol over either private or switched (message service) telephone lines. It operated at speeds of either 75 or 150 characters per second (cps). The 7702 operated at speeds of either 150, 250, or 300 characters per second.

The devices used a special incremental magnetic tape drive that was controlled by the STR communications unit. The drive used standard one half inch, seven track magnetic tape reels recorded at 200 bytes per inch (BPI). It moved the tape on demand in increments of .005 inches (0.13 mm) and was capable of reading data under the read/write head even when the tape was stationary. Either binary or BCD tapes could be processed.

The 7701 could communicate with a remote computer system or with another 7701 or 7702.

== Dimensions ==
The 7701 was 58 inches (150 cm) high, 29 inches (74 cm) wide, and 31 inches (79 cm) deep.
