= IBM 1009 =

Communications controller

The IBM 1009 Data Transmission Unit was an IBM communications controller introduced in 1960. The 1009 used the Synchronous transmit-receive (STR) protocol to transfer data at 150 characters per second (cps) over a single point-to-point dial or leased telephone line. The system was advertised as being able to "link the magnetic core memories of IBM 1401 computers over telephone lines."

The 1009 attached to IBM 1400 series computers such as the 1401

In 1961 the transmission rate was doubled to 300 cps.

In 1962 the 1009 was part of a test of data communications using the Telstar satellite to link two 1401 computer systems.
