= Virtu =

Virtu may refer to:

- Virtù, a theoretical concept elucidated by Niccolò Machiavelli
- Virtu Financial, a market making company
- Virtu Ferries, a Maltese company founded in 1988 that operates ferry services from Malta to Sicily
- Virtu Foundation, a non-profit organization that supports higher level music education
- SGI Virtu, visualization software from Silicon Graphics
