= Vertue =

Vertue is a surname. Notable people with the surname include:

- Beryl Vertue (1931–2022), English television producer
- George Vertue (1684–1756), English engraver and antiquary
- John Vertue (1826–1900), English Roman Catholic prelate
- Robert Vertue (died 1506), English architect and mason
- Sue Vertue, British television producer
- William Vertue (died 1527), English architect

== See also ==
- Vertue (yacht), design of yacht named after the Little Ships Club's Vertue Cup
- Virtue
