= WDU (software) =

Backup software

Westinghouse Disk Utility, popularly called WDU, is a copy/backup/restore program for IBM's DOS, DOS/VS, and DOS/VSE environments. In 1978, it was reported that WDU, a product of Westinghouse Electric Corporation, was in use at over 3,000 sites.

Originally designed for IBM's DOS, Westinghouse continued developing it for subsequent generations, including DOS/VS, DOS/VSE, and VM/CMS.

The product offered a wide variety of backup and copy options, data streaming, alternating tape drives, and an ability to create archives.

== Development ==
=== Pittsburgh ===
Steve O'Donnell wrote the original utility, which was distributed free of charge. Its popularity made Westinghouse realize WDU had potential as a commercial product, thus laying the foundation for the Westinghouse Software Group, eventually called WEMS, Westinghouse Management Systems.

=== Columbus ===
In 1972, IBM released DOS/VS with the IBM/370 and the Westinghouse Software group began a rewrite for new products. Several new team members were assigned, including John Gaston, who took over lead development following the departure of Steve O'Donnell in the latter 1970s. (Steve O'Donnell went on to found GOAL Systems, Inc.)

=== Paris ===
Westinghouse Marketing suffered a schism about the same time, and the result was that Europe established an independent subsidiary, Westinghouse Electric Management Systems, SA, or WEMSSA, headquartered in Paris. At that point, the Westinghouse product line, WDU and Westi, bifurcated, taking independent development paths.

=== Orlando ===
The original development team moved to Orlando, Florida, where it eventually came under the management of Dr. Ray Ferguson and focused on integration with VSE and later on, conjoining the bifurcated products.

A new development began initiated by III of Orlando, Florida and guided by Dr. Ferguson. Original plans called for both VM/CMS and new VSE versions. However, part way into development, Westinghouse began to break up the division during the outsourcing thrust of the Reaganomics era. Through badly managed negotiations, Westinghouse ended up with neither developers or outsourcing partners, which spelled the end for one of the industries foremost software groups.

== Marketing ==
North American marketing was conducted by the WEMS marketing group based in Pittsburgh, and included first level tech support.

Westinghouse Electric Management Systems, SA (WEMSSA), Paris, London, Geneva, Zürich, Munich, and Amsterdam, was given world marketing rights, initially for Europe, Africa, and the Far East.
