= IBM 1013 =

The IBM 1013 Card Transmission Terminal was a device manufactured by IBM in 1961 which transmitted the data held on 80-column cards to a remote computer or another 1013.

The speed was generally considered 100 cards per minute but could be faster if programmed to send/receive only a portion of the cards if all 80 columns were not used. It needed a full-duplex circuit to operate but at any given time could only transmit or receive.
