= IBM POWER (software) =

IBM operating system enhancement package

POWER was an IBM operating system enhancement package that provided spooling facilities for the IBM System/360 running DOS/360 or retrofitted with modified DOS/360. Upgrades, POWER/VS and POWER/VSE were available for and the IBM System/370 running DOS/VS and DOS/VSE respectively. POWER is an acronym for Priority Output Writers, Execution processors and input Readers.

== The product ==
POWER was an operating system enhancement available for DOS/360, DOS/VS, and DOS/VSE, and came packaged with some third party DOS-based operating systems. International Business Machines released POWER in 1969 following a public introduction at the IBM Wall Street Data Center.

It 'spooled' (queued) printer and card data, freeing programs from being dependent upon the speed of printers or punched card equipment.

POWER competed with non-IBM products, namely DataCorp's The Spooler and SDI's GRASP. Unlike the other products, POWER required a dedicated partition.

It allowed a single printer (1403/2311), punch (2520, 2540) or reader (2540, 2501) to be shared by two or more processing partitions. Input data was asynchronously loaded and directed to the proper partition by Job class. Output was directed to disk and stored there - then directed to a printer or punch by the writer type, (PRT, PUN), Job Class, Priority and form code. This was provided in PRT and PUN control cards in the input stream. Once the operator put the proper form in the printer/punch and told power to start (G PUN or G PRT on the console) the device would continue until no more output of that type was available. When a new form was encountered it would alert the operator to change forms and wait for the next go command.

== Platforms ==
The product ran on IBM systems from the System/360 Model 30 through larger machines. Generally the smaller machines that had less than 128K or Core memory (would be called RAM today but were actually magnetic cores strung on wire matrices) did not have the ability to run POWER. POWER/VS ran well on the later S/370 series - usually on the Models 135 and 145 and later on the 4331 and 4341.

=== Software ===
The product ran under several DOS-related platforms:

- DOS/360 and DOS/360 clones, 3rd party or modified
- DOS/VS
- DOS/VSE

=== Hardware ===
The hardware platforms included:

- IBM/360 which ran POWER
- IBM/370 which ran POWER/VS

and clones which included:

- Amdahl
- Fujitsu
- Hitachi
- Magnuson
- RCA
- Siemens

== See also ==
- Job entry control language
