= IBM 1030 =

The IBM 1030 Data Collection System was a remote terminal system created by IBM in Endicott, New York in 1963, intended to transmit data from remote locations to a central computer system.

== Description ==
The system consisted of the following components:

- 1031 Input Station. The 1031 systems could contain a card reader, badge reader, or manual input device. The 1031A contained the communications logic required to transmit data to a remote computer system ("central output unit" in IBM terminology). The 1031B communicated through an attached 1031A.
- 1032 Digital Time Unit. This device was located at central site and provided timestamps to incoming data.
- 1033 Printer. This was a remote printer attached to the 1031A.
- 1034 Card Punch. The 1034 was located at the central site and functioned as an output device for the 1030 when the computer system was offline.
- 1035 Badge Reader

The 1030 had limited editing capabilities, which consisted of checking that all required data was entered before transmitting a transaction.

The 1030 originally attached to an IBM 1440 computer through a 1448 Transmission Control Unit. Later it could be attached to an IBM System/360.
