= Telecommunications Access Method =

Telecommunications Access Method (TCAM) is an access method, in IBM's OS/360 and successors computer operating systems on IBM System/360 and later, that provides access to terminals units within a teleprocessing network.

== Features ==
TCAM provides similar functionality to QTAM, which it replaced. It was the access method for the initial version of Time Sharing Option (TSO). With the advent of IBM's SNA, TCAM was eventually superseded by VTAM.

TCAM was said to have the following enhancements over QTAM:

- Improved buffering, with more buffering options.
- Improved organization of message queuing on disk including multiple volume support.
- Back-up copies of messages maintained on disk.
- Improved testing and debugging including off-line testing, improved debugging, online terminal testing, and logging.
- Improved line handling for inquiry applications.
- "Significantly increases speed and efficiency over QTAM."
- Improved operator monitoring and control.
- Binary Synchronous Support.
- Checkpointing.

== Structure ==
TCAM consists of a Message Control Program (MCP) and zero or more application programs. The MCP handles communications with the terminals, identifies input messages and starts application programs to process them as required. This is similar in concept to the much later internet service daemon (inetd) in unix and other systems. It is also similar to QTAM, where the application programs are called Message Processing Programs (MPP).

The MCP is assembled by the user installation from a set of macros supplied by IBM. These macros define the lines and terminals comprising the system, the datasets required, and the procedures used to process received and transmitted messages.

The application programs, incorporating logic to process the various messages, are supplied by the installation, and use standard OS/360 data management macros OPEN and CLOSE, and either the Basic macros READ, WRITE, and CHECK, or the Queued macros GET and PUT. The use of SAM macros allows application programs to be tested in a batch processing environment.

== Device support ==
TCAM initially supported

- Binary Synchronous Communications (BSC) terminals
- Start/stop terminals
- 2260 terminals
- message queuing in storage and on disk

Support for 3270 terminals was soon added.
