= IBM 1050 =

Hardcopy computer terminal released by IBM in 1963

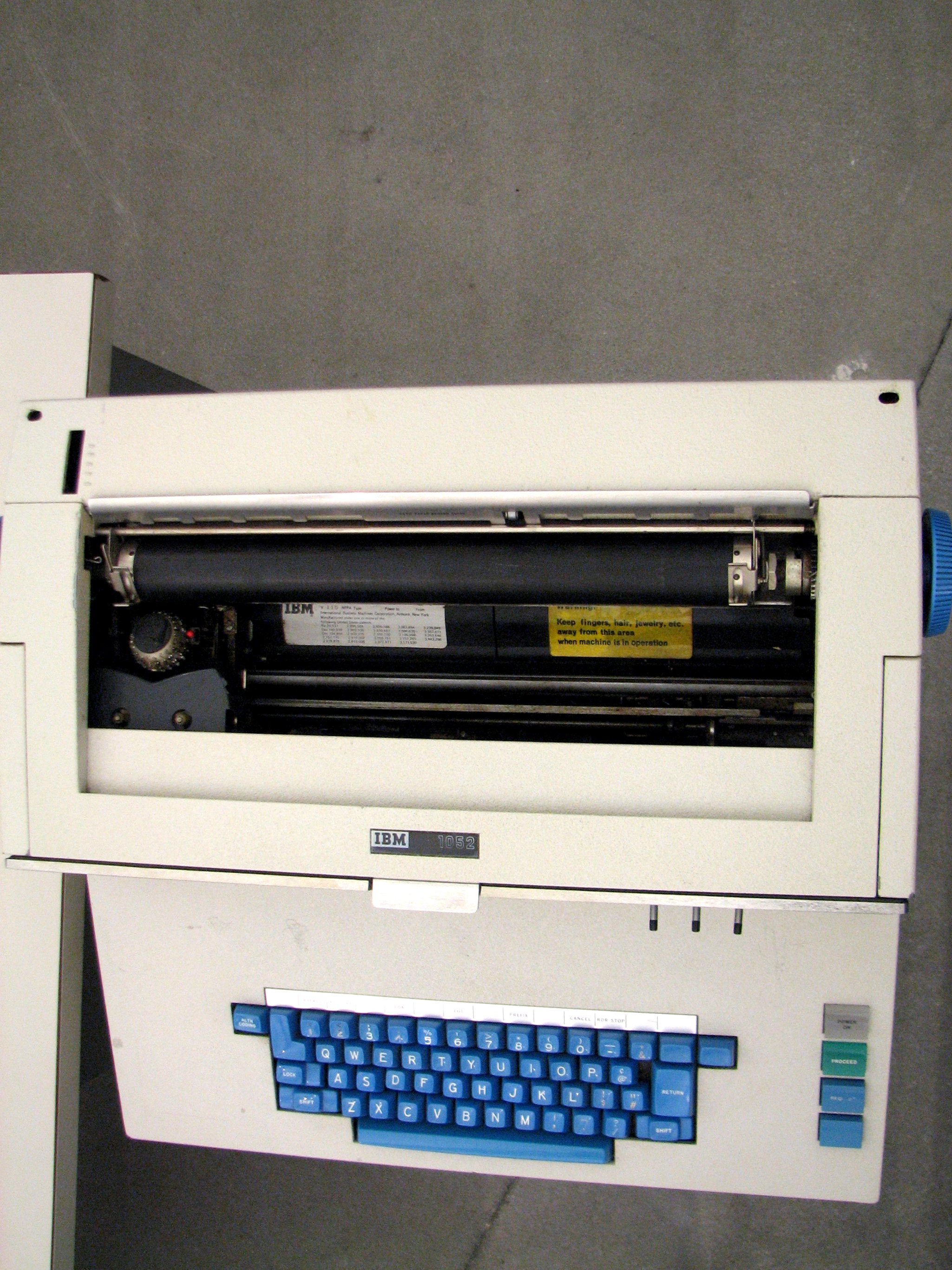
An IBM 1052 used as the console typewriter on a System/360 model 30.

IBM 1050 Data Communications System is a computer terminal subsystem to send data to and receive data from another 1050 subsystem or IBM computer in the IBM 1400, IBM 7000 or System/360 series. It first became available in 1963 and was used widely during the 1960s. The 1052 Printer-Keyboard was also the basis for the 1052-7 console Printer-Keyboard used on small and medium S/360 processors.

== General ==
The IBM 1050 Data Communications System was first introduced in 1963. The printer used the same removable typing element and mechanism as the IBM Selectric typewriter. The 1050 system could include the following devices:

- IBM 1051 Central Control Unit
- IBM 1052 Printer-Keyboard
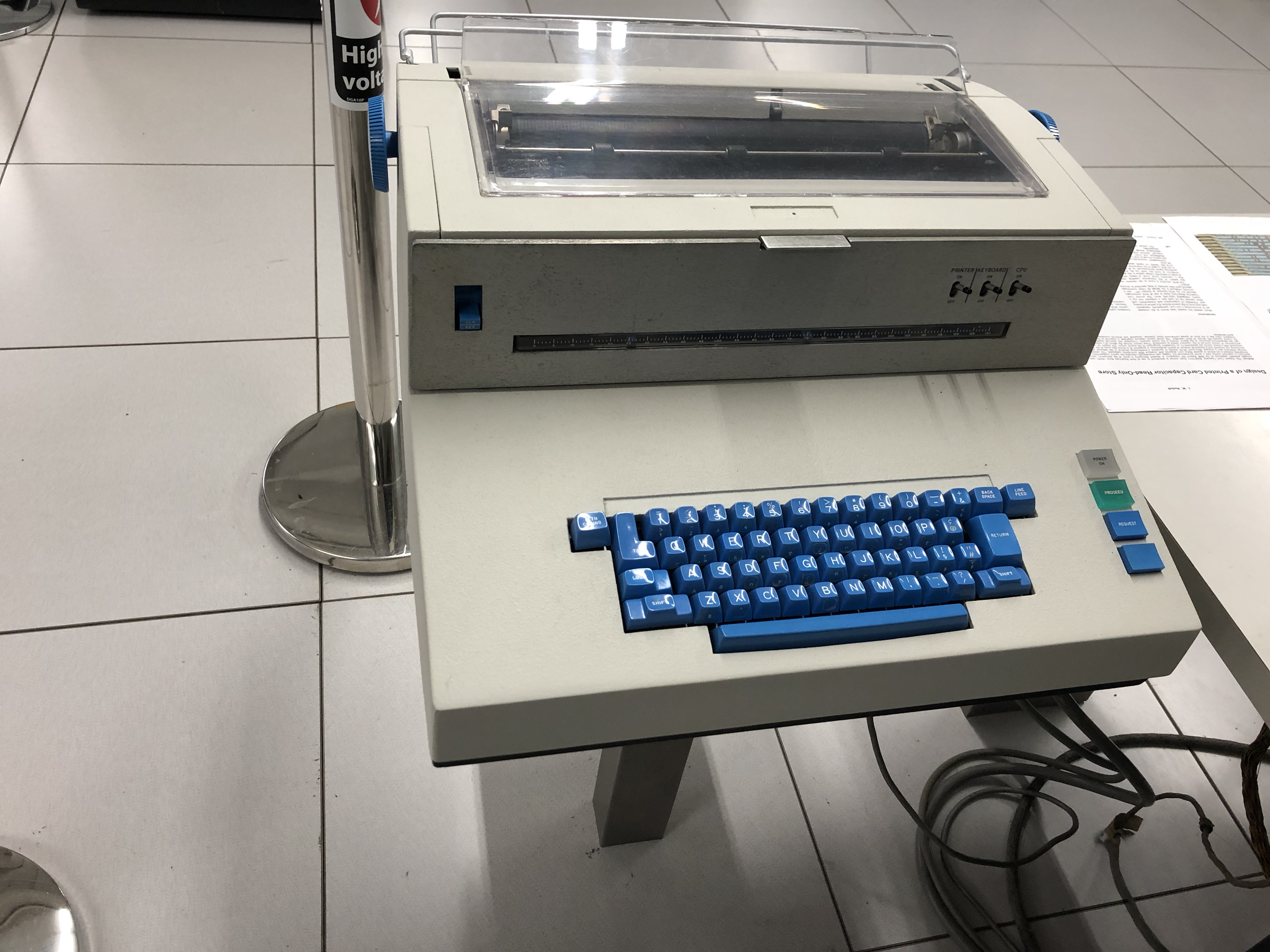
- IBM 1052 printer-keyboard
  IBM 1053 Console Printer
- IBM 1054 Paper Tape Reader
- IBM 1055 Paper Tape Punch
- IBM 1056 Card Reader
- IBM 1057 Card punch
- IBM 1058 Printing Card punch
- IBM 1092/1093 Programmed Keyboards
- IBM 2064 FBI PROGRAM

Communication was done serially, half-duplex, at 75 or 150 bits per second. A modem, such as IBM Line Adapter, was needed for connection to a communication line. The IBM 1050 featured multipoint asynchronous communication (Start Stop protocol), and improved error checking (LRC and VRC), with speed up to 14.8 characters per second (cps), equivalent to 134 baud, compared to the teleprinter's 10 cps. One IBM 1051 and another device were required per subsystem.

A set of IBM 1050 Data Communications System is exhibited at the University of Amsterdam Computer Museum in the Netherlands.

== See also ==
- IBM 2741
- List of IBM products
