= IBM 2260 =

Block-oriented computer terminal

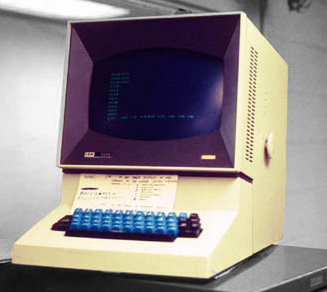
- IBM 2260 video terminal
- Manufacturer: International Business Machines Corporation (IBM)
- Product family: Model 1 and 2
- Released: 1964
- CPU: Discrete-component individual transistors
- Memory: (Acoustic delay line)
- Display: Monochrome CRT; Text display; 40x6 characters or 40x12 characters (Model 2) and 80x12 characters (Model 1)
- Input: Keyboard
- Successor: IBM 3270
- Related: IBM 2848 Display Control

The text-only monochrome IBM 2260 cathode-ray tube (CRT) video display terminal (Display Station) plus keyboard was a 1964 predecessor to the more-powerful IBM 3270 terminal line which eventually was extended to support color text and graphics.

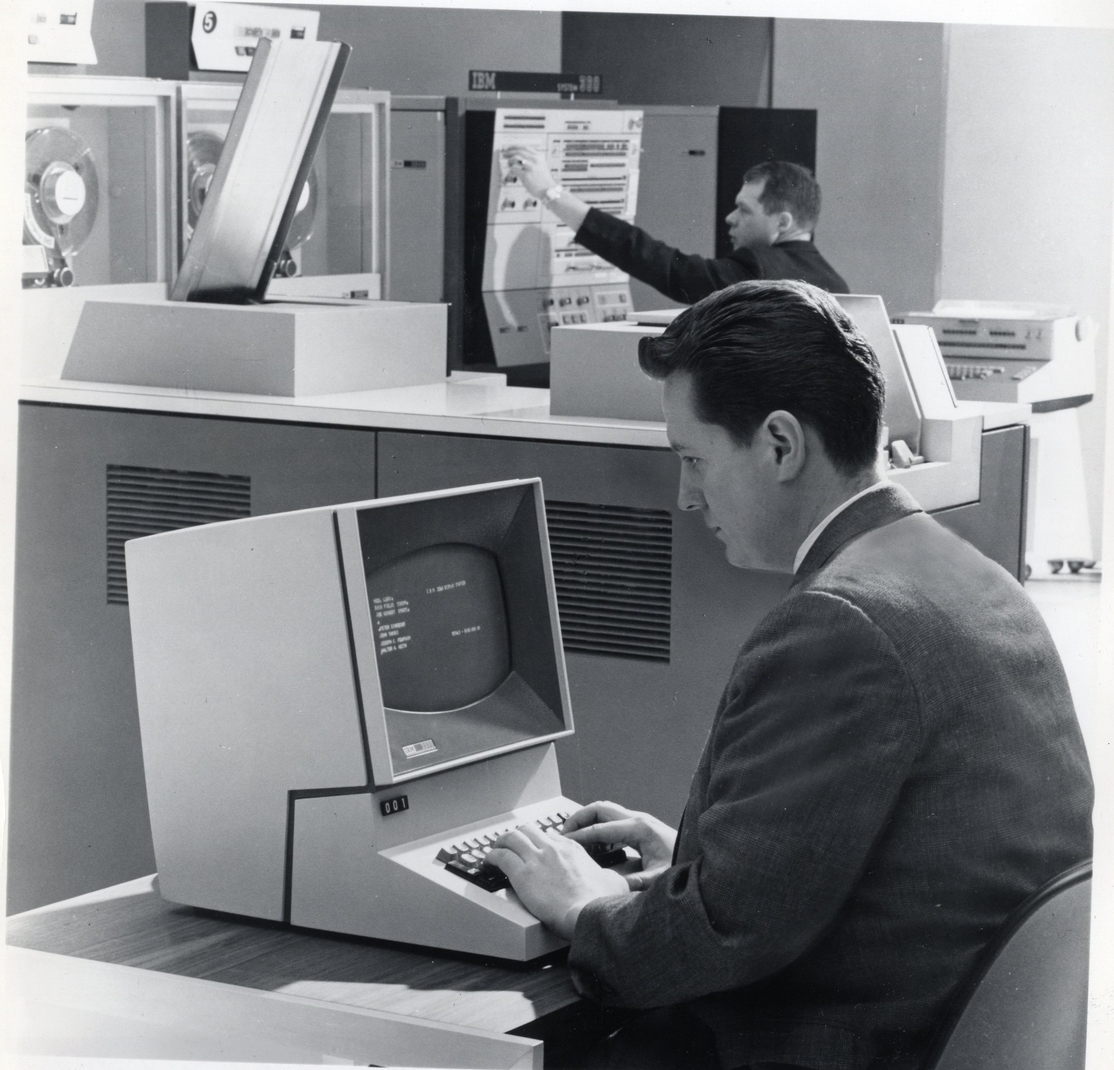
IBM 2260

There were two models of 2260. Model 1 displayed 960 characters, formatted as twelve rows of eighty characters, and connected to a 2848 Model 3. Model 2 displayed 240 characters, formatted as six rows of forty characters, when connected to a 2848 Model 1, or 480 characters, formatted as twelve rows of forty characters, when connected to a 2848 Model 2. A model without a keyboard was available for display-only applications. The eighty character width corresponded to IBM punch card format. The IBM 2260 and successor devices were transitional punch-card-to-CRT computer hardware that inspired many office of the future authors to write about the potential of the paperless office.

The 2260 was a raster display with the unusual property that the scan lines were vertical – they went from top to bottom rather than the more common left to right.

Up to twenty-four 2260 terminals were clustered around an IBM 2848 Display Control. The controller could function as a local channel-attached device or as a remote device at up to 2400 bit/s. An optional adapter allowed the attachment of one IBM 1053 printer which was shared by all displays attached to the 2848.

The 2848 stored the digital image of screens of information in an acoustic delay line. Before the introduction of integrated circuit chips, the technology was based on discrete-component individual transistors. Mainframe computers used magnetic core memory, which was too expensive for use in video display terminals. The delay line was an unusual mechanical (not electrical) spiral wire with an electromagnet on one end and a torsion rotation detector on the other (which was conceptually similar to a phonograph needle pickup). The central controller system vibrated the electromagnet like an audio-speaker voice coil. A fraction of a second later, the other end of the mechanical wire would vibrate. The vibration was converted to raster scan lines and sent to the nearby CRT display. The IBM 2848 delay line was a continuous electromechanical feedback loop.

One effect of the 2848 delay line was that if a heavy person walked next to the controller, or if it was mounted next to a vibration source (like an elevator), digital bits of screen images would be lost on all of the video displays, which would then be repeated continuously through the feedback loop until a new video display was transmitted to all of the connected terminals.

The IBM 2265 attached to an IBM 2845 is a less expensive equivalent to a 2260 attached to a 2848, for users who do not require more than one terminal.

The IBM 2260 and 2265 as well as the IBM 2848 were unusual in their usage of the approved, but never published 1965 revision of the ASCII standard ASA X3.4-1965.
