= IBM System z9 =

Line of mainframe computers

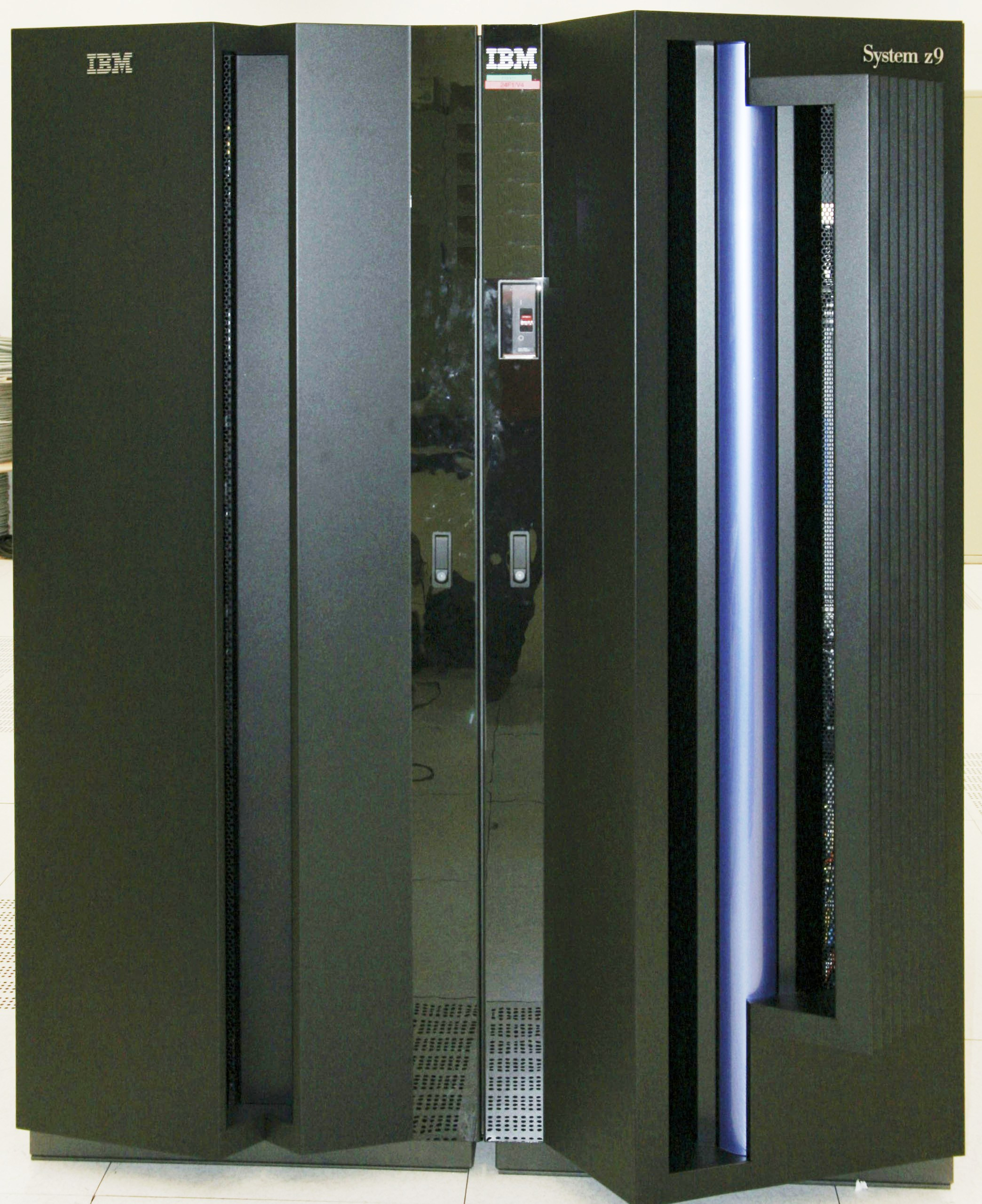
- IBM 2094 System z9
- Manufacturer: IBM
- Product family: IBM Z
- Type: Mainframe
- Released: 2005; 21 years ago
- Discontinued: 2008
- Predecessor: IBM eServer zSeries
- Successor: IBM System z10

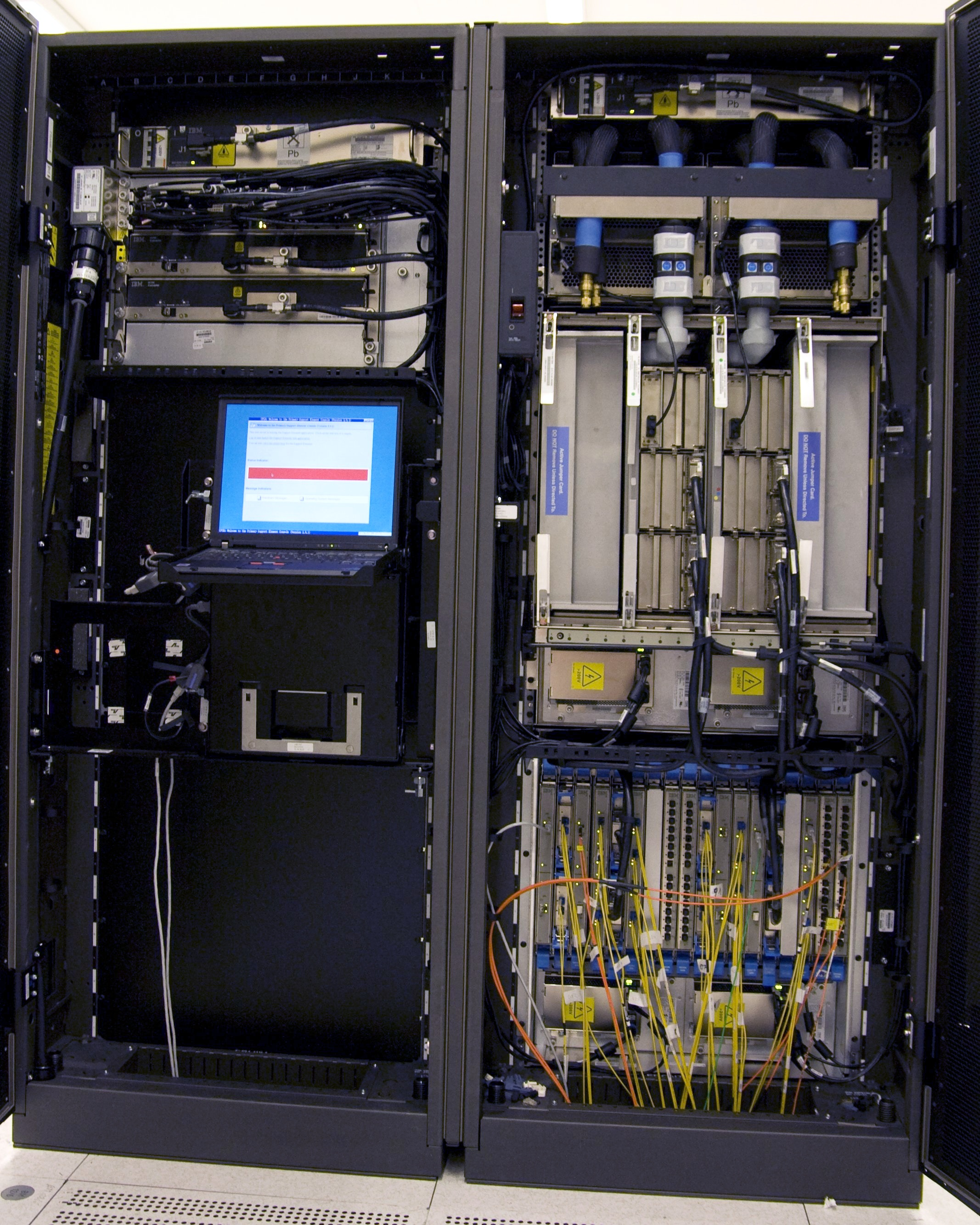
IBM 2094 System z9, open front with one Support Element

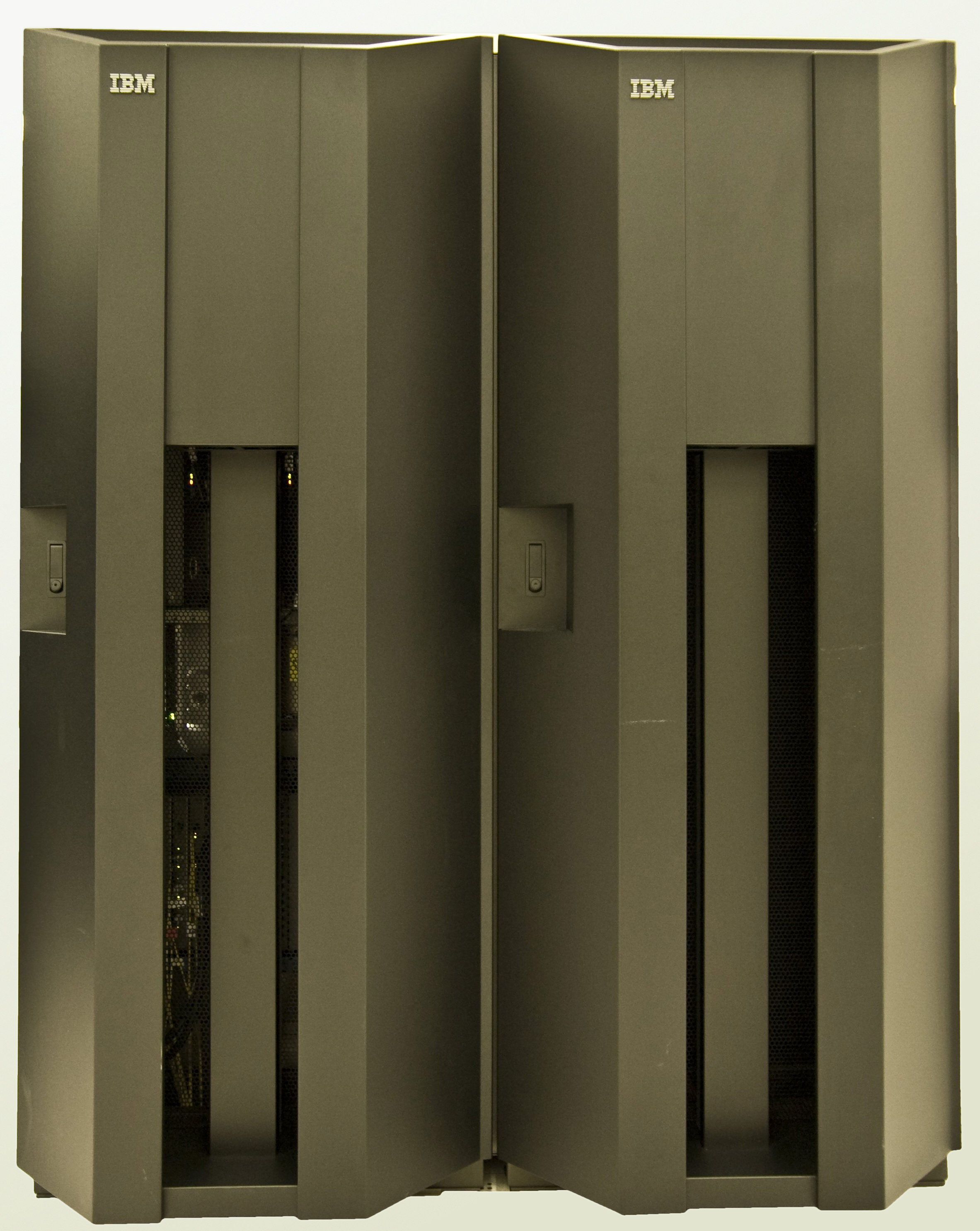
IBM 2094 System z9, rear

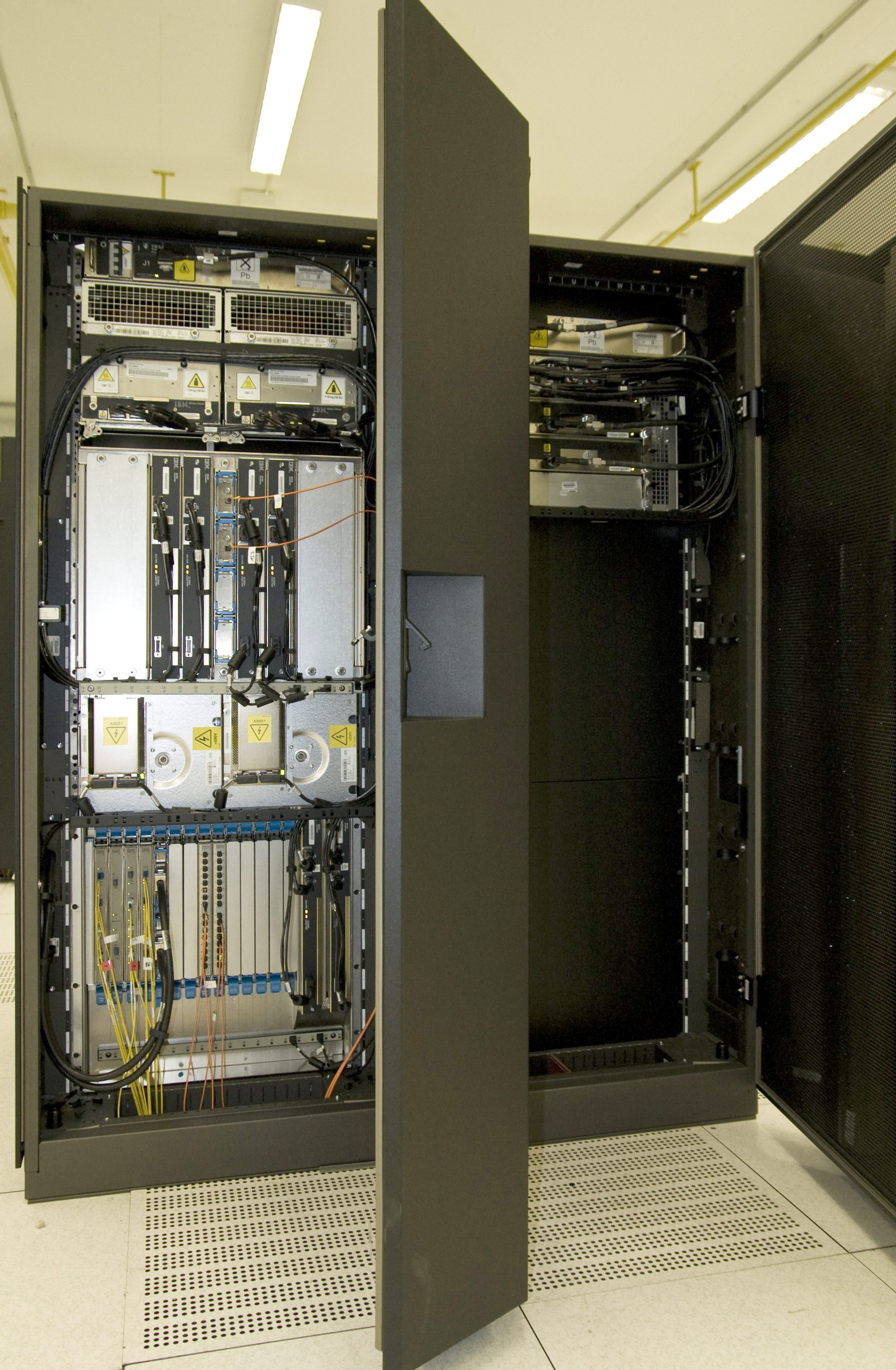
IBM 2094 System z9, open rear

IBM System z9 is a line of IBM mainframe computers. The first models were available on September 16, 2005. The System z9 also marks the end of the previously used eServer zSeries naming convention. It was also the last mainframe computer that NASA ever used.

== Background ==
System z9 is a mainframe using the z/Architecture, previously known as ESAME. z/Architecture is a 64-bit architecture which replaces the previous 31-bit-addressing/32-bit-data ESA/390 architecture while remaining completely compatible with it as well as the older 24-bit-addressing/32-bit-data System/360 architecture. The primary advantage of this arrangement is that memory intensive applications like DB2 are no longer bounded by 31-bit memory restrictions while older applications can run without modifications.

=== Name change ===
With the announcement of the System z9 Business Class server, IBM has renamed the System z9 109 as the System z9 Enterprise Class server. IBM documentation abbreviates them as the z9 BC and z9 EC, respectively.

== Notable differences ==
There are several functional enhancements in the System z9 compared to its zSeries predecessors. Some of the differences include:

=== Support Element & HMC ===
The Support Element is the most direct and lowest level way to access a mainframe. It circumvents even the Hardware Management Console and the operating system running on the mainframe. The HMC is a PC connected to the mainframe and emulates the Support Element. All preceding zSeries mainframes used a modified version of OS/2 with custom software to provide the interface. System z9's HMC no longer uses OS/2, but instead uses a modified version of Linux with an OS/2 lookalike interface to ease transition as well as a new interface. Unlike the previous HMC application on OS/2, the new HMC is web-based which means that even local access is done via a web browser. Remote HMC access is available, although only over an SSL encrypted HTTP connection. The web-based nature means that there is no longer a difference between local console access and remote access, which means a remote user potentially has full control if authorized, allowing more flexibility for locating systems within data centers. IBM refers to the new HMC as a "closed platform" which does not allow the user to install software or access the command line interface to increase security and stability. The HMC is also firewalled by default with a minimal number of open ports for remote access.

=== Program Directed Re-IPL ===
Program Directed Re-IPL is a new feature for Linux on System z9. It allows Linux systems running in an LPAR to re-IPL (reboot) themselves without operator intervention. This is accomplished by the System z9 storing the device and load parameters used to initially IPL the system.

=== DB2 and VSAM features ===
DB2, VSAM, and other data storage formats achieve greater I/O performance thanks to a new System z9 feature called a MIDAW. Also, the System z9 introduces the zIIP, a new type of processor that accelerates certain specific DB2 tasks. Modified Indirect Data Address Words (MIDAWs) are a channel programming capability of the IBM System z9 processor range, and all subsequent ranges. The MIDAW facility is an extension to the pre-existing Indirect Data Address Word (IDAW) channel programming capability, providing support for more efficient FICON channel programs. MIDAWs allow ECKD channel programs to read and write to many storage locations using one channel command, which means fewer signals up and down the channel are required to transfer the same amount of data. This reduction is particularly noticeable for Extended Format data sets, accessed through Media Manager. Examples include Extended Format Sequential data sets, Extended Format VSAM data sets and certain types of DB2 tablespaces. While each of these data set organizations have alternatives, each has a distinct set of advantages, whether in the area of performance, space saving (through hardware-assisted data compression), or scalability (by allowing an individual data set to exceed 4 GiB).

=== Java features ===
Java 1.4 and higher support both 32-bit and 64-bit operation on z9. The System z9 also supports the zAAP processor, which allows most of the Java workload to be offloaded from the normal instruction processors. Java workloads executed by the zAAP processor do not count towards the IBM-rated capacity of the z9. This reduces the z9's total cost of ownership compared with other IBM platforms, as otherwise IBM would raise a customer's (software) license fees after installing an additional (hardware) processor. The zAAP also enables integration of new Java based Web applications with core z/OS backend database environment for high performance, reliability, availability, and security.

=== Cryptography ===
The System z9 adds 128-Bit Advanced Encryption Standard (AES) to the list of hardware-based cryptographic algorithms. Other hardware-boosted features include additional random number generation and SHA algorithms. This specialized encryption hardware means System z9 potentially outperforms other platforms which must rely on encryption software.

=== LPARs ===
The System z9 supports up to 60 LPARs, up from the previous maximum of 30.

=== Larger memory capacity ===
The System z9 supports twice its immediate predecessors' maximum memory configurations: now up to 512 GB for the z9 EC and up to 64 GB for the z9 BC.

=== Concurrent system board replacement ===
The System z9 supports nondisruptive processor and memory replacement. That means a technician can replace an entire system board without ending any applications and without restarting any operating systems. In most configurations a System z9 can even manage this feat without any reduction in performance or capacity for the running applications.

=== 4 Gbit FICON and FCP ===
In May 2006, IBM added 4 Gigabit FICON and FCP support to the System z9 for faster I/O to storage devices. IBM also added a lower cost 2-port 4 Gbit FICON/FCP I/O adapter to the System z9 option list.

=== Smooth subcapacity increments ===
Also in May 2006, IBM introduced subcapacity settings to its high end model. For the first time mainframe processors now allow small, smooth steps through the entire processor range. This feature allows IBM's customers to control their software costs precisely and to pay for only exactly as much capacity as they need without harsh price discontinuities at certain capacity increments. (IBM started offering variable subcapacity software pricing in 2000, and some other software vendors now offer similar terms, so hardware subcapacity settings are of primary interest when running so-called full capacity software products.)

=== Group capacity limits ===
Available with z/OS Release 8, Group Capacity Limits allows an installation to define a group of LPARs within a single z9 or z10 machine whose capacity usage can be limited to a specific number of MSUs. Usage is based on the rolling 4 hour average CPU consumption, also in MSUs. A group need not necessarily be the same as an LPAR Cluster. LPARs can participate whether they are in a sysplex or not.

=== Separate processor pools ===
While previous mainframe generations (including the predecessor zSeries z990) supported specialty processors, such as zAAPs and ICFs, these were all managed by PR/SM out of the same processor pool (Pool 2). The IBM System z9 EC introduced the concept of separate pools for different types of specialty processor. This greatly eases the tasking of managing and measuring the performance of the different processor types. With z9 (and IBM System z10) the following pools are defined:

- 1 General-purpose processors
- 3 IFLs
- 4 zAAPs
- 5 ICFs
- 6 zIIPs

Pool 2 is no longer used.

In addition to these 5 pools of characterized processors, there are three other categories of processor:

- Service Assist Processors (for assisting with I/O operations) which all machines have.
- Spare processors (to replace characterized processors in the event of a failure) which all machines have.
- Unpurchased processors (which can be purchased and then characterized) which all but the most fully characterized machines have.

== Models ==
IBM System z9 product line
	2004	2005	2006	2007	2008
Main frames
Dual-rack	zSeries z990	z9 S08			z10 EC
Dual-rack	zSeries z990	z9 S18			z10 EC
Dual-rack	zSeries z990	z9 S28			z10 EC
Dual-rack	zSeries z990	z9 S38			z10 EC
Dual-rack	zSeries z990	z9 S54			z10 EC
Single-rack	zSeries z890		z9 S07		z10 BC
Single-rack	zSeries z890		z9 R07		z10 BC

=== Enterprise Class ===
The System z9 Enterprise Class server, formerly known as the System z9 109, was the flagship of the System z9 series until the announcement of the IBM System z10. The most powerful model, the 2094-S54, achieves approximately twice the transactional performance of its most powerful predecessor, the zSeries z990 (2084-332). A single 2094-S54 machine provides up to 54 main processors (plus scores of secondary processors), at least two spare main processors, and up to 512 GB of main memory. Minimum memory is 16 GB.

The System z9 EC is available in five hardware model configurations:

- 2094-S08
- 2094-S18
- 2094-S28
- 2094-S38
- 2094-S54

=== Business Class ===
On April 27, 2006, IBM announced the System z9 Business Class, also known as the z9 BC, as the successor to the zSeries z890 mainframe. IBM is positioning the z9 BC as a midrange system with a low cost of acquisition with up to twice the performance of the z890. The first z9 BCs began shipping on May 26, 2006. The z9 BC supports up to seven main processors (plus a dozen or more secondary processors). While the z9 BC can provide general purpose central processors (CPs), IBM is actively marketing the use of low cost specialty processors such as IFLs, zAAPs, and the new zIIPs. (Every z9 BC can support at least three specialty engines even when maximally configured with CPs.) The z9 BC comes with a minimum of 8 GB of RAM and is expandable up to 64 GB. IBM offers kits that allow current z800 and z890 customers to upgrade to the z9 BC. A z9 BC customer can then upgrade to the z9 EC if extra capacity is required.

The System z9 BC is available in two hardware model configurations:

- 2096-R07
- 2096-S07

The seven System z9 hardware configurations support scores of software model configurations: 2094-401 through 2094-754 for the EC and 2096-A01 through 2096-Z04 for the BC (plus IFL-only models).

=== Pricing ===
The acquisition price for the System z9 ranges from "about $100,000" (IBM reported U.S. 2006 price, 2096-A01 model) to millions of dollars for the 2094-S54. (These prices are for new installations. Generally there are lower prices when upgrading from the immediate predecessor model, more like many software products and quite unlike most other hardware products.) For comparison, when new, the zSeries z890 had a starting price about twice that of the System z9 BC.

=== Successor machine ===
In February 2008, the IBM System z10 Enterprise Class was announced (and later in 2008 the z10 Business Class (BC) was announced). The z10 features quad-core technology, for up to 64 processors. The z10 has a number of power-saving, space-saving and throughput improvements compared to the z9.

Preceded by IBM S/390	IBM System z 2000 - 2008: eServer zSeries; 2000 / System z9 2005 / System z10 2008	Succeeded by IBM zEnterprise System
