= OpenSolaris for System z =

Mainframe operating system (2008–2010)

- Developer: Sine Nomine Associates
- OS family: OpenSolaris
- Working state: defunct
- Initial release: 7 October 2008; 18 years ago
- Supported platforms: IBM System z
- Official website: OpenSolaris for System z

OpenSolaris for System z is a discontinued port of the OpenSolaris operating system to the IBM System z line of mainframe computers.

== History ==
OpenSolaris is based on Solaris, a UNIX-based operating system originally released by Sun Microsystems in 1991. Sun open-sourced the bulk of the Solaris system source code as OpenSolaris on 14 June 2005, which made it possible for developers to create other OpenSolaris distributions. Sine Nomine Associates began a project to bring OpenSolaris to the IBM mainframe in July, 2006. The project was named Sirius (in analogy to the Polaris project to port OpenSolaris to PowerPC). In April 2007, Sine Nomine presented an initial progress report at IBM's System z Technical Expo conference.

At the Gartner Data Center Conference in Las Vegas, Nevada in late 2007, Sine Nomine demonstrated OpenSolaris running on IBM System z under z/VM. It was there that David Boyes of Sine Nomine said that OpenSolaris for System z would be available "soon".

At the SHARE conference on 13 August 2008, Neale Ferguson of Sine Nomine presented an update on the progress of OpenSolaris for System z, including a working demonstration. During this presentation he said that while OpenSolaris is "not ready for prime-time" they hoped to have a version available to the public for testing "in a matter of weeks rather than months."

In October 2008, Sine Nomine released the first "prototype" of OpenSolaris for System z (lacking a number of features such as DTrace, Solaris Containers and the ability to act as an NFS server) to the public. OpenSolaris for System z had a project page at OpenSolaris.org. OpenSolaris for System z is available for download at no charge, governed by the same open source license terms as OpenSolaris for other platforms. All source code is available; there were no OCO (object code only) modules.

The port uses z/Architecture 64-bit addressing and therefore requires a mainframe running IBM System z. The port depends on z/Architecture processor instructions not supported on mainframe models older than System z9. It also will not run on the initial release version of the Hercules mainframe emulator; the needed changes are included in the SVN version 5470 of Hercules. It also requires the paravirtualization features provided by z/VM; it will not run on "bare metal" or in a logical partition (LPAR) without the z/VM hypervisor at Version 5.3 level or later. Because OpenSolaris uses a new network DIAGNOSE instruction, PTF VM64466 or VM64471 must be applied to z/VM to provide support for that instruction. On 18 November 2008, IBM authorized the use of IFL processors to run OpenSolaris for System z workloads.

== Discontinuation ==
In March 2010, The Register reported having received an email from a "Solaris on Z-series supporter", saying that:

The SystemZ port of Solaris is dead. Oracle pulled all plugs and refused to further help the authors to help. Critical parts are closed parts of libc.so.1, the core user land library which has closed source parts. Oracle now refuses to give precompiled binaries of newer versions of the closed parts to the SystemZ port community, effectively ending this port because the missing bits cannot be replicated or bypassed.

== See also ==
- Linux on IBM Z
- UTS (Mainframe UNIX)
