= IBM Chiphopper =

Chiphopper is a component of the IBM eServer products specifically tailored to the Linux operating system. IBM developed the server products in a collaborative effort with Red Hat and Novell of SUSE Linux ownership at the time. The official name of the product suite is IBM Systems Application Advantage for Linux. Chiphopper is a set of system support and testing tools designed to assist development, and porting of Linux x86 applications onto other IBM systems and middleware platforms. The Chiphopper offering helps developers whose applications run on x86 Linux systems by providing tools to scrub their C/C++ code for portability prior to porting to Power ISA and System z systems. Source hardware platforms for 32- and 64-bit applications are x86, EM64T, and AMD systems running Linux Standard Base (LSB) 3.x certified Linux distributions.
