= Linux on IBM Z =

Usage of Linux operating system on IBM mainframes

Linux on IBM Z, Linux on zSystems, or zLinux are collective terms for the Linux operating system compiled to run on IBM mainframes, especially IBM Z, zSystems, and LinuxONE servers. Similar terms which imply the same meaning are Linux/390, Linux/390x, etc. The three Linux distributions certified for usage on the IBM Z hardware platform are Red Hat Enterprise Linux, SUSE Linux Enterprise Server, and Ubuntu.

== History ==
Linux on IBM Z originated as two separate efforts to port Linux to IBM's System/390 servers. The first effort, the "Bigfoot" project, developed by Linas Vepstas in late 1998 through early 1999, was an independent distribution and has since been abandoned. IBM published a collection of patches and additions to the Linux 2.2.13 kernel on December 18, 1999, to start today's mainline Linux on IBM Z. Formal product announcements quickly followed in 2000, including the Integrated Facility for Linux (IFL) engines. Think Blue Linux was an early mainframe distribution consisting mainly of Red Hat packages added to the IBM kernel. Commercial Linux distributors introduced mainframe editions very quickly after the initial kernel work. The first lines of mainframes supported by Linux enterprise distributions were System/390 G5, G6, and Multiprise 3000.

IBM manager Karl-Heinz Strassemeyer of Böblingen in Germany was the lead to get Linux running on S/390.

At the start of IBM's involvement, Linux patches for S/390 included some object code only (OCO) modules, without source code. Soon after, IBM replaced the OCO modules with open source modules. Linux on IBM Z is free software under the GNU General Public License.

According to IBM, as of May 2006, over 1,700 customers were running Linux on their mainframes. Some examples are Nomura Securities, Home Depot, and the University of Pittsburgh.

== Virtualization ==
Virtualization is required by default on IBM Z; there is no option to run Linux on IBM Z without some degree of virtualization. (Only the very first 64-bit mainframe models, the z900 and z800, included a non-virtualized "basic mode".) The first layer virtualization is provided by the Processor Resource and System Manager (PR/SM) to deploy one or more Logical Partitions (LPARs). Each LPAR supports a variety of operating systems, including Linux on IBM Z. A hypervisor called z/VM can also be run as the second layer virtualization in LPARs. This allows an LPAR to run as many virtual machines (VMs) as can be supported by the resources assigned to the LPAR. KVM on IBM Z is another hypervisor option.

When Linux applications in an LPAR access data and applications in other LPARs, such as CICS, IBM Db2, IMS, Linux, and other mainframe subsystems running on the same physical mainframe, they can utilize HiperSockets, which are memory-only TCP/IP connections. As compared to TCP/IP over standard network interface controllers (NICs, also known as Open System Adapters (OSAs) in mainframes), HiperSockets can improve end-user responsiveness (reduce network latency and processing overhead), security (since there is no network connection to intercept), and reliability (since there is no network connection to lose).

With the zEC12, zBC12, and later models, the HiperSocket concept is extended beyond the physical machine boundary via an RDMA over Converged Ethernet (RoCE) adapter to facilitate a secure and high-speed inter-system communication. Applications in LPAR A in system A can thus use HiperSockets to communicate with applications in LPAR B in system B to ensure the security and performance attributes.

== Hardware ==
Beginning with Linux kernel version 4.1 released in early 2015, Linux on IBM Z is only available as a 64-bit operating system compatible with z/Architecture mainframes. Previously, Linux on IBM Z was also available as a 32-bit operating system, with 31-bit addressing, compatible with older model mainframes introduced prior to 2000's z900 model. However, the newer 64-bit Linux kernel and 64-bit Linux on IBM Z distributions are still backward compatible with applications compiled for 32-bit Linux on IBM Z. Historically, the Linux kernel architecture designations were "s390" and "s390x" to distinguish between the 32-bit and 64-bit Linux on IBM Z kernels respectively, but "s390" now also refers generally to the one Linux on IBM Z kernel architecture.

Linux runs on standard, general purpose mainframe CPs (Central Processors) as well as IFLs (Integrated Facility for Linux). IFLs are mainframe processors dedicated to running Linux, either natively or under a hypervisor (z/VM or KVM on IBM Z). Microcode restricts IFLs from running "traditional" workloads, such as z/OS, but they are physically identical to other IBM Z processors. IFLs are typically less expensive to acquire from IBM than CPs.

Linux on IBM Z gives the flexibility of running Linux with the advantages of fault-tolerant mainframe hardware capable of over 90,000 I/O operations per second and with a mean time between failure (MTBF) measured in decades. Using virtualization, numerous smaller servers can be combined onto one mainframe, gaining some benefits of centralization and cost reduction, while still allowing specialized servers. Combining full virtualization of the hardware plus lightweight Virtual Machine containers that run Linux in isolation (somewhat similar in concept to Docker) result in a platform that supports more virtual servers than any other in a single footprint, which also can lower operating costs. Additional savings can be seen from reduced need for floor space, power, cooling, networking hardware, and the other infrastructure needed to support a data center.

IBM mainframes allow transparent use of redundant processor execution steps and integrity checking, which is important for critical applications in certain industries such as banking. Mainframes typically allow hot swapping of hardware, such as processors and memory. IBM Z provides fault tolerance for all key components, including processors, memory, I/O Interconnect, power supply, channel paths, network cards, and others. Through internal monitoring, possible problems are detected and problem components are designed to be switched over without failing a transaction. In the rare event of failure, firmware will automatically enable a spare component, disable the failing component, and notify IBM to dispatch a service representative. This is transparent to the operating system, allowing routine repairs to be performed without shutting down the system. Many industries continue to rely on mainframes where they are considered to be the best option in terms of reliability, security, or cost.

== Support ==
Like all other versions of Linux, Linux on IBM Z is governed by the GPL free software license. Complete Linux on IBM Z source code is available from numerous parties on a free and equal basis, and architectural support is part of the main Linux kernel effort. IBM assigns several of its programmers to the community effort, but IBM is by no means the only participant.

Though there are no obstacles to running any Linux on IBM Z distribution on an IBM z System, IBM routinely tests three particular Linux on IBM Z distributions: Red Hat, SUSE, and starting in 2015, Canonical's Ubuntu Linux. Other notable Linux on IBM Z distributions include Debian (upstream for Ubuntu), Fedora (upstream for RHEL), Slackware, CentOS Stream, Alpine Linux and Gentoo.

Nearly every free or open-source software package available for Linux generally is available for Linux on IBM Z, including Apache HTTP Server, Samba, JBoss, PostgreSQL, MySQL, PHP, Python programming language, Concurrent Versions System (CVS), GNU Compiler Collection (GCC), LLVM, Perl, and Rust, among many others.

Red Hat and SUSE offer mainline support for their distributions running Linux on IBM Z. In 2015 Canonical announced plans to offer official support for its distribution starting in early 2016. IBM Global Services also offers support contracts, including 24x7 coverage. Some standard Linux software applications are readily available pre-compiled, including popular closed-source enterprise software packages such as WebSphere, IBM Db2 and Oracle databases and applications, SAP R/3, SAP ERP, and IBM's Java Developer's Kit (JDK), to name only a few.

== Developer resources ==
IBM offers resources to developers wishing to target Linux for z:

- The Linux Test Drive, a free program granting a single Linux on IBM Z virtual machine for 30 days.
- The IBM Systems Application Advantage for Linux (Chiphopper), a developer program to help developers write and publish cross-platform Linux software.
- The Community Development System for Linux on IBM Z (CDSL) program, a platform for providing open source developers a platform for porting to Linux on System z.
- The Linux Remote Development Program, a fee-based extended developer support program.

Linux on IBM Z supports Unicode and ASCII just like any other Linux distribution—it is not an EBCDIC-based operating system. However, for convenience, Linux is able to read kernel parameters in EBCDIC. z/VM takes advantage of this capability.

Porting Linux applications to Linux on IBM Z is fairly straightforward. Potential issues include endianness (Linux on IBM Z is big-endian) and reliance on non-portable libraries, particularly if source code is not available. Programs can be easily cross compiled to z/Architecture binaries on non-mainframe Linux systems.

=== Emulators ===
There are at least three software-based IBM Z mainframe emulators.

- FLEX-ES from Fundamental Software is a commercially offered option, limited to 31-bit addressing.
- The open source Hercules emulator supports Linux on IBM Z (and can even run on Linux on System z itself).
- In 2010, IBM introduced the Rational Developer for System z Unit Test Feature (now called Rational Development and Test Environment for z, or sometimes RDTz for short) which provides a restricted use execution environment that can run on X86 hardware. IBM's license terms limit use of RDTz to certain application development tasks, not including final pre-production compiling or pre-production testing (such as stress testing). RDTz includes z/OS (with common middleware) and is also compatible with Linux on IBM Z.

== See also ==
- Comparison of Linux distributions
- IBM Secure Service Container
- OpenSolaris for System z
- Linux on Power
- UNIX System Services
- zIIP
- zAAP
- z/TPF
- z/VSE
