= Integrated Facility for Linux =

Type of IBM mainframe processor

The Integrated Facility for Linux (IFL) is an IBM mainframe and Power Systems processor dedicated to running the Linux operating system. On IBM Z and IBM LinuxONE machines, IFLs can be used with or without hypervisors such as z/VM and KVM. IFLs are one of three most common types of "specialty" IBM mainframe processors that give software vendors (and their customers) more granular control over software licensing and maintenance costs. (The other most common specialty processors are zIIPs and ICFs). Microcode restricts IFLs to Linux workload by omitting some processor instructions not used by the Linux kernel (that other operating systems use), but the underlying processors are physically identical to general purpose processors (CPs). When IBM adds features and performance improvements to its mainframes' general purpose main processors (which can also run Linux), those features and improvements nearly always apply equally to IFLs. In fact, in recent IBM Z machines IFLs support simultaneous multithreading, a feature not available for general purpose processors.

IBM announced IFLs on August 1, 2000, and started shipping them on September 29, 2000. At the same time, IBM introduced a special Linux-only, VM-like product called the S/390 Virtual Image Facility for Linux to cater to IT staff previously unfamiliar with IBM mainframes. IBM soon discovered that z/VM was not too difficult for new IT staff to learn (and worked better), so IBM withdrew S/390 Virtual Image Facility for Linux from marketing on April 30, 2002.

Customers could purchase IFLs for all IBM mainframes as far back as the G5 series and can purchase IFLs for all recent IBM Z and LinuxONE machine models. IFLs also support select IBM software appliances such as the IBM Db2 Analytics Accelerator, zAware, and z/VSE Network Appliance, and they also supported the Z port of the now abandoned OpenSolaris operating system. Fujitsu and Hitachi also offered IFLs on certain models of their machines.

On Power Systems IFLs are also specially priced for both the processors and many software products.

== See also ==
- Linux on IBM Z
