= Loginventory =

Network inventory software tool

LOGINventory
- Developer: Schmidt's LOGIN GmbH
- Operating system: Microsoft Windows
- Platform: IA-32, x86-64
- Available in: English, French, Spanish, German
- Type: Asset management
- License: Freemium
- Website: loginventory.com

LOGINventory is an agentless network inventory tool created by German software company Schmidt's LOGIN GmbH. LOGINventory is compatible with various Microsoft Windows operating systems.

== Functionality ==
LOGINventory collects the data of networked Windows computers as well as the information of other SNMP-capable devices, such as print servers, hubs, routers, and switches. LOGINventory works agentless by using existing APIs and is integrated into Microsoft Management Console. LOGINventory is free for up to 20 PCs.

== History ==
Version 3 of the tool was released in January 2002. Version 8 was released in 2020.

== See also ==
- Windows Management Instrumentation
