= Job control =

Job control may refer to:

== Computing ==
- Job control (computing), the control of jobs on a computer system
- Job control (Unix), control of jobs via a shell in Unix and Unix-like operating systems
- Job Control Language, a programming language for scripting job control on an IBM mainframe computer

== Other uses ==
- Job control (workplace), the ability of a person to influence what happens in their work environment
