= Hup =

Hup or HUP may refer to:

== Art and music ==
- Hup (album), a 1989 album by The Wonder Stuff
- "Hüp", a single by Turkish singer Tarkan
- Hup (comics), a series of four comics published by Last Gasp from 1986–1992 by R. Crumb

== Organizations ==
- Hanoi University of Pharmacy, in Vietnam
- Harvard University Press, in Cambridge, Massachusetts
- Howard University Press, in Washington, D.C.
- Hospital of the University of Pennsylvania, in Philadelphia

== Other uses ==
- Hup people, an Amazonian indigenous people in Brazil and Colombia
- Hup language a language of Brazil and Colombia
- hup, the ISO 639 code for the Hupa language of California, United States
- Heisenberg's uncertainty principle
- Hungarian Unix Portal
- Humphrey Park railway station, in England
- HUP Retriever, a US Navy utility helicopter
- SIGHUP, a Unix signal
