= ATRM =

ATRM or atrm may refer to:

- Aetrium, a company, by NASDAQ stock ticker
- atrm, a Unix at computer command
- AT&T SportsNet Rocky Mountain

== See also ==
- aTrm56, an enzyme
