= Command language =

Language for job control in computing

A command language is a language for job control in computing. It is a domain-specific and interpreted language; common examples of a command language are shell or batch programming languages.

These languages can be used directly at the command line, but can also automate tasks that would normally be performed manually at the command line. They share this domain—lightweight automation—with scripting languages, though a command language usually has stronger coupling to the underlying operating system. Command languages often have either very simple grammars or syntaxes very close to natural language, making them more intuitive to learn, as with many other domain-specific languages.

== See also ==
- Command-line interface
- In the Beginning... Was the Command Line
- Batch processing
- Job (computing)
