= PTC Scheduler =

PTC Scheduler is a Windows based batch scheduling application. Via the use of either "Agents" or Telnet connections, PTC Scheduler is able to schedule and monitor batch processes on the following platforms:

- Windows (NT/XP/2000/2003/Vista)
- Sun Solaris 8/9/10
- Red Hat Linux 7.3
- Red Hat Fedora 4
- AIX
- GCOS 7

== Overview ==
Some of the features of PTC Scheduler are:

- Monitoring changes in batch duration to allow alerting of abnormal job execution
- Alerting upon job failure via SMS, Telephony & Email
- Message users for confirmation of steps to take during the batch execution
- Dashboard display of job execution status

== History ==
PTC Software is a UK-based company which specialises in the development and distribution of enterprise systems management (ESM) software products.

PTC was formed in 1983 to provide a range of Systems Management utilities to the users of Honeywell Bull’s large mainframe computers. PTC’s first package was an early Job Scheduling solution called "Job Flow Control Facility". Indeed, this was probably one of the first job scheduling systems available anywhere.

As the Honeywell Bull marketplace has eroded over the last twenty years, so PTC has expanded its product set to support many operating systems including Unix, Windows and VAX, whilst remaining firmly rooted to the original areas of expertise in Systems Management.

The latest Scheduling tool, PTC Scheduler, is the fourth-generation product and encompasses over twenty years of direct experience gained from the needs and wishes of many large (200 servers) and small customers (1-5 servers).

The new generation of tools has been expanded into the areas of service availability and management. Areas which are becoming increasingly important for Technology departments or companies who wish to provide a measurably significant quality of service to their customers. This generation also incorporates full alert escalation ability and a Microsoft SQL Server database for permanent storage.

In recent years, PTC Scheduler has been enhanced to provide scheduling for various housing applications including

- Pericles
- IBS
