= Control Panel (Windows) =

Component of Microsoft Windows and Windows Server

- Control Panel in Windows 11
- Developer: Microsoft
- Release: 1985; 41 years ago
- Operating system: Microsoft Windows
- Successor: Settings (Windows)
- Type: Control panel

Control Panel is a component of Microsoft Windows that provides the ability to view and change system settings. It consists of a set of applets that include adding or removing hardware and software, controlling user accounts, changing accessibility options, and accessing networking settings. Additional applets are provided by third parties, such as audio and video drivers, VPN tools, input devices, and networking tools.

== Overview ==
Control Panel has been part of Microsoft Windows since Windows 1.0, with each successive version introducing new applets. Beginning with Windows 95, the Control Panel is implemented as a special folder (i.e. the folder does not physically exist), and as such only contains shortcuts to various applets such as Add or Remove Programs and Internet Options. Physically, these applets are stored as .cpl files so that they can be shown on the Control Panel. For example, the Add or Remove Programs applet is stored under the name appwiz.cpl in the SYSTEM32 folder.

Starting with Windows Me, the Control Panel home screen was changed to present a categorized navigation structure reminiscent of navigating a web page. Users can switch between the grid-based Classic View and the category view via a link on the Web view panel on the left-hand side or on a drop-down menu on the top-right corner of the window. In Windows Vista onwards, additional layers of navigation were introduced, and the Control Panel window itself became the main interface for editing settings as opposed to just launching separate dialogs. Many of the individual Control Panel applets can also be accessed in other ways. For instance, Display Properties can be accessed by right-clicking on an empty area of the desktop and choosing Properties. The Control Panel can be accessed from a command prompt by typing control; optional parameters are available to open specific control panels.

On Windows 10, Control Panel is deprecated in favor of Settings app, which was originally introduced on Windows 8 as "PC Settings" to provide a touchscreen-optimized settings area using its Metro-style app platform. Some functions, particularly the ability to add and remove user accounts, were moved exclusively to this app on Windows 8 and cannot be performed from Control Panel. Beginning with the October 2020 update of Windows 10, the System applet in Control Panel now redirects to the About section of the Settings app. The page for the applet in Control Panel still exists even in current versions of Windows 10 and can still be accessed via workarounds, however Microsoft is actively trying to block various shortcuts and third-party apps that can access the aforementioned page, which could potentially lead to a permanent removal of said page from Control Panel in future versions of Windows.

== List of Control Panel applets ==
The applets listed below are components of the Microsoft Windows control panel, which allows users to define a range of settings for their computer, monitor the status of devices such as printers and modems, and set up new hardware, programs and network connections. Each applet is stored individually as a separate file (usually a .cpl file), folder or DLL, the locations of which are stored in the registry under the following keys:

1. HKLM\SOFTWARE\Microsoft\Windows\CurrentVersion\Control Panel\Cpls
  This contains the string format locations of all .cpl files on the hard drive used within the control panel.
2. HKLM\SOFTWARE\Microsoft\Windows\CurrentVersion\Explorer\ControlPanel\Namespace
  This contains the location of the CLSID variables for all the panels not included as cpl files. These are commonly folders or shell applets, though Windows Vista allows physical programs themselves to be registered as well. The CLSID then allows items such as the icon, infobox and category to be set and gives the location of the file to be used.

The control panel then uses these lists to locate the applets and load them into the control panel program (control.exe) when started by the user. In addition to using the control panel, a user can also invoke the applets manually via the command processor. For instance, the syntax "Control.exe inetcpl.cpl" or "control.exe /name Microsoft.InternetOptions" will run the internet properties applet in Windows XP or Vista respectively. While both syntax examples are accepted on Windows Vista, only the former one is accepted on Windows XP.

== Standard applets ==
Accessibility options (Access.cpl) (control /name microsoft.easeofaccesscenter)
(Renamed "Ease of Access Center" in Windows Vista and later)
Allows users to configure the accessibility of their PC and enable the use of assistive technologies. It was originally a separate utility called Utility Manager, which was first introduced in Windows 2000. It comprises various settings primarily aimed at users with disabilities or hardware problems.
- The behavior of the keyboard can be modified, this is aimed at people who have difficulty pressing key-combinations, or pressing a key just once. (StickyKeys, FilterKeys and ToggleKeys)
- Behavior of sounds can be modified. (SoundSentry and ShowSounds)
- High contrast mode can be activated.
- The keyboard cursor can be customized.
- The pointer can be controlled using the keyboard. (MouseKeys)
- A screen magnifier can be enabled. (Magnifier)
- A screen reading application can be enabled. (Narrator)
- An on-screen keyboard can be toggled.

This applet has since been superseded by the Ease of Access control panel applet from Windows Vista onwards, but it still uses the access.cpl filename.

Add New Hardware (hdwwiz.cpl)
Launches a wizard which allows users to add new hardware devices to the system. This can be done by selecting from a list of devices or by specifying the location of the driver installation files.
Add or Remove Programs (appwiz.cpl)
(Renamed "Programs and Features" in Windows Vista and later)
The Add/Remove Programs dialog allows the user to manipulate software installed on the system in a number of ways;
- Allows users to uninstall and change existing software packages, as well as indicating how much space individual programs take and how frequently they are used.
- Allows users to manually install software from a CD-ROM or floppy disk, and install add-ons from Windows Update.
- Allows users to change which Windows components are installed, via the Windows setup Wizard, which includes Internet Explorer, Windows Media Player and Windows Messenger
- Allows users to specify the default applications for certain tasks, via the 'set program access and defaults' wizard, such as web browsers, media players and email programs and whether access to these programs is available (since Windows 2000 Professional Service Pack 3 and Windows XP Service Pack 1)
Administrative Tools (control admintools)
Contains tools for system administration, including security, performance and service configuration. These are links to various configurations of the Microsoft Management Console such as the local services list and the Event Viewer.
Automatic Updates (wuaucpl.cpl)
This is used to specify how the Automatic Updates client (wuauclt.exe) should download updates from the Microsoft Update Website, by default this is set to download and install daily, however this can be changed to a more suitable frequency. This also allows the user to specify whether to ask permission before downloading and/or installing updates or to simply switch off Automatic Updates altogether.

Removed in Windows 10 and moved to the Settings app.

Date and time (timedate.cpl)
Allows user to change the date and time stored in the machine's BIOS, change the time zone and specify whether to synchronize the date and time with an Internet Time Server and which server to use.
Display (control desktop) (desk.cpl)

(Renamed "Personalization" in Windows Vista, 7 and 8.1)

Allows the user to change the display characteristics of their computer;
- Allows users to change the desktop background (wallpaper) to a picture of their choice and specifies how it should be shown.
- Allows the user to change or disable the screensaver, and specify how long it takes to activate and whether to ask for a password on resume
- Allows the user to specify the color styles of all elements within the system, primarily whether to use the Windows XP / Vista styles (blue by default in XP) or to use the classic Windows 98 / 2000 / Me styles, this also allows the user to change the My Computer and Recycle Bin icons.
- Allows the user to change the screen resolution and colour quality, and provides trouble shooting advice for displays.

Removed in Windows 10 and moved to the Settings app.

Folder Options (control folders) (rundll32.exe shell32.dll, Options_RunDLL 0)
This item allows for configuration of how folders and files are presented in Windows Explorer. More specifically it allows the user to specify general settings like whether folders open in a new window or the existing window and whether the common tasks pane is shown, as well as more advanced tasks such as whether windows should hide critical system files and whether to show file extensions. It is also used to modify file type associations in Windows; i.e., which program opens which type of file and other settings like actions for each file type and the file extension.
Fonts (control fonts)
Displays all fonts installed on the computer. Users can remove fonts, install new fonts or search for fonts using font characteristics. Note that "explorer \Windows\Fonts" has the same effect.

Moved to the Settings app on Windows 11 2024 Update, but the shortcut still exists. Clicking on it goes to the Settings app.

Internet Options (inetcpl.cpl)
Allows the user to change the way the computer manages internet connections and browser settings for Internet Explorer and Microsoft Edge, it has several tags specifying different attributes;
- General – This specifies the homepage and color schemes and allows the user to delete internet usage history.
- Security & Privacy – These specify whether the computer should allow websites to undertake certain processes and download cookies, this panel also gives access to the inbuilt pop-up blocker (Windows XP SP2 and later) and the phishing controls (Internet Explorer 7).
- Content – Allows the parental controls and auto-complete to be configured and also specifies how to deal with certificates.
- Connections, Programs and Advanced – These give access to other aspects of internet settings such as the default modem connection and email client, proxy settings and other advanced configurations.
Game controllers (joy.cpl) (control /name microsoft.gamecontrollers)
Allows one to add, display, troubleshoot, and use advanced settings on joysticks and game controllers and connect to other type of game controllers.

This applet still exists on Windows 10 onwards, however there is a similar page in Settings starting with the Windows 10 Anniversary update.

Keyboard (control keyboard) (main.cpl)
Lets the user change and test keyboard settings, including cursor blink rate and key repeat rate.
Mail (mlcfg32.cpl) (mlcfg.cpl)
Mail allows for configuration of the mail client in Windows. Microsoft Outlook Express cannot be configured with this item; it is configured through its own interface. mlcfg.cpl is used for 64 bit office applications first available with the Office 2010 release.
Mouse (control mouse) (main.cpl)
Mouse allows the configuration of pointer options, such as the double click and scroll speed, and includes visibility options such as whether to use pointer trails and whether the pointer should disappear when typing. This also allows the user to specify the pointer appearance for each task, such as resize and busy.
Network Connections (control netconnections) (ncpa.cpl)
Displays and allows the user to edit or create network connections such as Local Area Networks (LAN) and internet connections. It also offers troubleshooting functions in case the computer has to be reconnected to the network.
Phone and Modem Options (telephon.cpl)
Manages telephone and modem connections.
Power Options (powercfg.cpl)
Includes options to manage energy consumption such as;
- Specify how long it takes to switch off the display and hard drives and how long it takes for the system to enter standby, if at all.
- To decide what to do when the computer's on/off button is pressed, such as whether to shut down or to enter standby.
- Whether to allow hibernation (some systems become unstable when restarting).
- Allows the user to configure UPS (if available).
- Since Windows Vista, additional hidden power options are available for fine tuning power features.
Printers and Faxes (control printers) (control /name microsoft.devicesandprinters)
Displays all the printers and faxes currently installed on the computer, and has two main uses;
- Firstly, it shows all the jobs queued for each printer, the file size and status of each job and which user they belong to, it also allows each job to be paused, canceled or moved up or down the list.
- Secondly, it allows the user to set the printing or faxing preferences, such as paper size and quality via the manufacturers own preferences pane and also specifies how to share the printer across a computer network, the device drivers, ports etc.
Regional and Language Settings (intl.cpl) aka Regional and Language Options
Various regional settings can be altered, for instance:
- The way numbers are displayed (e.g. decimal separator).
- How Currency values are displayed, including the currency symbol.
- Time and date notations, such as the date separator and whether the clock should be in 12 or 24 hours.
- Cultural location of the user's computer (The time zone is set in Date and Time).
- Language;
  - Input language.
  - Keyboard layout (mapping between key strokes and characters).
  - Display language for Menus and Dialog Boxes.
  - Preferred language list (Windows 8, Windows 8.1 and Windows 10 version 1511 only; Later this moved to Windows Settings)
- Whether files necessary for Asiatic language support must be installed.
- Installed code pages.
Security Center or Action Center (Windows 7 & 8.x) (wscui.cpl)
Renamed "Security & Maintenance" in Windows 10
First added in Windows XP with Service Pack 2, Security Center gives the user access to the inbuilt Windows security components, as well as providing information about any existing antivirus software such as McAfee or Zone Alarm. It includes access to Windows Update, where users can specify whether the computer should check for updates regularly (also available through the Windows Update panel), and options for managing internet security settings. It also includes links to internet articles about PC security and current virus threats and notifies the user when the PC's security is compromised.
Sounds and Audio Devices (mmsys.cpl)
This panel contains various audio-related functions;
- Change the speaker volume and type and specify whether to show the volume icon in the notification area.
- Change the sounds played for the system or specific programs when a certain event occurs, i.e. Windows Startup or Critical Stop.
- Change default devices for music playback, recording, voice recognition, MIDI etc.
- Change the Sound card settings and whether to use Hardware acceleration.
- Display the audio devices installed on the computer, and allows them to be configured.
Speech (Sapi.cpl)
This applet has two main functions, the first is specify settings for Speech synthesis, allowing the user to select the voice the computer should use to narrate text and how fast it should read. The second is to specify settings for Speech recognition, allowing the user to set up different profiles detailing how the computer should deal with an individual's dialect, for instance;
- The amount of grammatical errors in a person's voice (punctuality sensitivity).
- The speed at which the person speaks, and the time delay between words.

This also allows the user to access the voice recognition training wizard, in which an individual 'teaches' the computer to recognize a person voice interactively using the microphone.

Stored User Names and Passwords (keymgr.dll) (control.exe /name microsoft.credentialmanager)
(Renamed "Credential Manager" in Windows 7 and later)
This is used to view and edit logon credentials for servers, websites and programs.
System (Sysdm.cpl)
This is used to view and change core system settings, a user can for instance:
- Display general information on the user's machine such as the amount of RAM, CPU speed and type, the version of Windows the system is using and the manufacturer.
- Edit the computer name in a network workgroup.
- Manage and Configure hardware devices, and view information such as the manufacturer, user access and driver version of any hardware device installed on the system via Device Manager.
- Enable/Disable system features such as automatic updates and System restore monitoring.
- Specify advanced features such as performance logs, virtual memory settings and roaming profiles.

Moved to the Settings app on Windows 10, but the shortcut still exists. Clicking on it goes to the Settings app.

Taskbar and Start Menu (rundll32.exe shell32.dll, Options_RunDLL 1)
Allows the user to change the behavior and appearance of the task bar and Start Menu;
- Specifies whether to use Windows XP/Vista or Classic 9x/2000/Me styles on the taskbar and start menu (in versions of Windows prior to 7).
- Whether the taskbar should Auto-Hide.
- Whether to show the clock in the notification area.
- Allows the user to manage the tray icons.
- Advanced options such as whether to show Printers & Faxes in the start menu and whether to display My Documents as a menu or as a link to a new window.

Moved to Settings on Windows 10.

User Accounts (control userpasswords) (nusrmgr.cpl)
This allows the user to configure their account and other accounts used in the system, should they have sufficient privileges. They can change their username, password, their account picture (if enabled), and their .NET Passport (in versions of Windows prior to Vista). If the current user has an administrator account they can also add, delete, and modify other user accounts as well as make changes to core system settings. This panel also specifies whether or not the guest account should be active and (in Windows XP only) whether or not to use the Welcome screen when Windows loads.

This applet is hidden in Windows Server 2003 onwards, and invoking "control userpasswords" in the Run command will instead run the Local Users and Groups utility.

Users and Passwords (control userpasswords2) (rundll32.exe netplwiz.dll, UsersRunDll)
Similar to the User Accounts applet (see above), this allows the user to configure their account and other accounts used in the system, set passwords, change their .NET Passports (in versions of Windows prior to Vista), as well as configuring autologin settings. This panel also specifies whether or not to press Ctrl+Alt+Del before login.

This applet was originally used for managing user accounts in Windows 2000 Professional, and remains as a hidden applet after the introduction of a new User Accounts applet in Windows XP. It is hidden in Windows 2000 Server onwards, but unlike the above applet, invoking "control userpasswords" (and "control userpasswords2" in Windows Server 2003 and later) in the Run command will load the respective applet instead of the Local Users and Groups utility.

== Peripheral devices ==
These are options in the control panel that show devices connected to the computer. They do not actually offer a direct interface to control these devices, but rather offer basic tasks such as removal procedures and links to wizards (Printers & Faxes is an exception). Such applets include Scanners and Cameras, Game Controllers, and Portable Media Devices.

== Other Microsoft-distributed applets ==
Biometric Devices (biocpl.dll)
Available with Fingerprint enabled systems running 7 or later, this enables users to configure a Fingerprint reader, showing a list of all Biometric devices interacting with the system, in addition to the following items;
- Allowing users to change fingerprint data.
- Allowing users to change behaviour on fingerprint detected.

Moved to Settings on Windows 10.

Bluetooth Devices (bthprops.cpl)
Available with Bluetooth enabled systems running XP SP2 or later, this enables users to configure a Bluetooth connection, showing a list of all Bluetooth devices interacting with the system, in addition to the following items;
- Allowing users to create incoming and outgoing 'virtual' COM Ports, which allow devices to have dedicated connections to the system.
- Allowing users to specify general Bluetooth characteristics such as whether the computer is discoverable and the computer's name which is broadcast.

Moved to Settings on Windows 10.

Color (color.cpl)
Enables a more advanced control of color settings within Windows than is available in 'display', suitable for developers and visual specialists it allows users to create and load International Color Consortium compliant color profiles, associate screen color with printers and cameras and view a 3D graphics plot of the color gamut. By default this applet is not installed, however it can be installed for free from the Microsoft Website.
Infrared (irprops.cpl)
Similar to the Bluetooth applet, this is used to configure how the computer manages any wireless infrared ports installed, including options such as connectivity and security.
Location and Other Sensors (SensorsCpl.dll)
Manages Location based data like addresses and other location based sensors. Available in Windows 7 & 8.x only.
CSNW (nwc.cpl)
The Client Service for NetWare applet is used to select a default tree and context in a Novell Directory Services (NDS) environment, or the NetWare server used most frequently in a non-NDS environment.

Requirement: Installing the Client Service for NetWare.

Software Explorers
Part of User Account Control, allows users to view detailed information about software that is currently running on the computer that can affect the users' privacy or the security of the computer.

Replaced by Windows Defender Security Center on Windows 10.

== Third-party applets ==
Third-party software vendors have released many applets. Although it is impossible to mention all of them, some of them are listed here:

Icon	File name	Description
AC3 Filter	ac3filter.cpl	Configures speaker configuration and other parameters of the AC3 decoder filter.
Adobe Gamma	Adobe Gamma.cpl	For altering the screen display with Adobe Systems Imaging Software such as Photoshop.
Adobe Version Cue CS2	VersionCueCS2.cpl	To configure Adobe Version Cue.
Application paths	apppaths.cpl	Sets application paths, start-up commands and system services, coded by Gregory Braun.
ATI DVD Player	QISWCINE.CPL	Changes settings for your DVD decoding.
AudioHQ	AudHQ.cpl	Creative Labs Soundblaster Audio HQ.
Autodesk Plotter Manager	plotman.cpl	Adds, remove and changes plotters properties for AutoCAD products.
AvantGo Connect	agcpl.cpl	Synchronizes mobile versions (called "channels") of websites to a smartphone or PDA, see AvantGo.
Avira AntiVir PersonalEdition	avconfig.cpl	Configures Avira Antivirus program.
BACKPACK Finder	bpcpl.cpl	To configure the Micro Solutions BackPack CD driver.
BDE Administrator	bdeadmin.cpl	To configure the Borland Database Engine.
Boot Camp Control Panel		Setting for Mac OS X based computers.
Broadcom Advanced Control Suite	BACSCPL.cpl	Enables Broadcom network cards testing and diagnostics.
CD/DVD Drive Acoustic Silencer	TOSCDSPD.cpl	Configures the rotation speed of CD/DVD drive. (Toshiba )
ClearCase	cc.cpl	To configure IBM Rational ClearCase.
Color Settings	3dcc.cpl	Changes the look and feel of Windows.
Compaq Diagnostics	cpqdiag.cpl	To view information a computer's hardware and software configuration, legacy application.
Control Panel	controlp.cpl	Control Panel Customization Toy, coded by Ali Lokhandwala.
Control Version System	cvsnt.cpl	Control Panel Customization Toy, by Brian Berliner. david d 'zoo' zuhn, Jeff Polk, Tony Hoyle
Creative Element Power Tools		To configure Creative Element Power Tools, a free-to-try program providing access to additional Windows tools.
Corel Versions	verscpl.cpl	Configures Corel versions.
DANS	danetsvc.cpl	Configures the Shaffer Solutions DiskAccess Network Services, NFS client for Windows.
Diagnostics for Windows	cpqdiag.cpl	HP Diagnostics for Windows 4.15 replaces Compaq
Digidesign ElevenRack	DigidesignElevenRackControlPanelApplet.cpl	Launch Eleven Rack Control Panel
DiskAccess	dacfg.cpl	Configures how the Shaffer Solutions DiskAccess makes connections to remote NFS servers.
DS18x Applet	DS18xCPL.cpl	MR Soft DS18x Temperature Logging Service.
Flash Player	FlashPlayerCPLApp.cpl	For changing settings for the Flash Player.
Folder size	FolderSize.cpl	Folder Size for Windows shows the size of folders in Windows Explorer.
FirebirdSQL Service Manager	fmmgr.cpl	Configures Firebird (database server) service options.
HP Jetadmin	jetadmin.cpl	HP Jetadmin configures and monitors HP printers.
HP Lock	Hplock.cpl	A Windows 95 utility to lock the PC keyboard, mouse and on/off switch in one click on legacy HP Vectra.
IconPackager	ipcpl.cpl	To customize Windows icons and cursors, see IconPackager.
ImDisk Virtual Disk Driver	imdisk.cpl	Administration of ImDisk Virtual Disk Driver.
InstallShield Update Manager	isuspm.cpl	The InstallShield Update Manager allows users to receive program updates and messages from software makers who use the service.
Intel Extreme Graphics	igfxcpl.cpl	To change advanced settings on systems using Intel GPUs.
Intel Product Improvement Program	executable	Installed with Intel Driver Update Utility version 2.4 (on Vista and up)
IP Office Voicemail Pro	ims.cpl	To configure Avaya IP Office Voicemail Pro.
Java	jpicpl32.cpl	For changing settings with Java Runtime Console.
JInitiator 1.x.y.z	plugincpl1xyz.cpl	To configure Oracle's JInitiator, note x.y.z are version numbers.
Mail	MLCFG32.cpl	Launches the Microsoft Outlook Profile Manager.
MSConfig	MSConfig.cpl	Launches the Microsoft System Configuration Utility.
Multi-finger	ETDUI.cpl	Customize the Smart-Pad Multi-finger Setting.
MultiSite	ms.cpl	To configure IBM Rational ClearCase Multisite.
Nero BurnRights	NeroBurnRights.cpl	For specifying who is allowed to use the CD burner with Nero.
nVIDIA Control panel	nvidia.cpl	To change advanced settings on systems using nVIDIA GPUs.
Panda Media Booster	PMB.cpl	Panda Media Booster cache and network settings.
Parallel Port Joysticks	PPjoy.cpl	Configures Joysticks connected on the Parallel Port.
Pointer Devices	tbctlpnl.cpl	To configure the Touch-Base Universal Pointer Device Driver (UPDD).
QuickTime	quicktime.cpl	For specifying settings of the Apple QuickTime Player.
RealPlayer	prefscpl.cpl	To configure the RealPlayer preferences, older versions.
Realtek AC97 Audio Control Panel	alsndmgr.cpl	To configure the Realtek audio controller.
Realtek HD-Audio Manager	RTSnMg64.cpl	To launch the Realtek HD-Audio Manager
RESTrick Control Panel	rest2.cpl	Windows Tuning and system restrictions setup, by Rtsecurity.
Safarp	safarp.cpl	Safarp is a small and fast alternative to the Add or Remove Programs applet.
ScrewDrivers Client	sdclient.cpl	From Tricerat, remote desktop print management solution.
Send To Toys	sendtotoys.cpl	To configure the Send To right click system menu in Microsoft Windows.
Services and Devices	pserv.cpl	From p-nand-q to manage Windows services and devices and uninstall applications.
Softex OmniPass	scurecpl.cpl	Softex OmniPass provides password management capabilities to MS Windows.
SNTP Service	sntpserv.cpl	From Dillobits Software, to manage the SNTP client service.
Soundscape	scurecpl.cpl	Adds, removes or changes settings of Soundscape devices.
Startup	startup.cpl	Control programs that run at system start-up, coded by Mike Lin.
Startup Disk	Startup Disk.cpl	Boot Camp drivers, when Windows runs on a Mac OS virtual machine.
Symantec LiveUpdate	s32lucp2.cpl	Configures the Symantec LiveUpdate update service.
System Change Log	scl.cpl	From Greyware Automation Products, monitors disks for changes and records a detailed log.
System Information	Sancpl.cpl	Launches SiSoftware Sandra utility.
System Info for Windows	siw.cpl	Launches the SIW application.
Trust-No-Exe	trustnoexe.cpl	Configures the Beyond Logic Trust-No-Exe executable filter.
VMware Tools	VMControlPanel.cpl	To configure VMware Tools.
WIBU-KEY	wibuke32.cpl	To configure the WIBU-KEY Software Protection.
Winlogos	wnlgo.cpl	To change the Windows start-up and shutdown screens in Windows 98 or ME, coded by Ali Lokhandwala.
X-Setup Pro	xqdcXSPApplet.cpl	Launches X-Setup Pro, a Windows tweaker application.
