= Fcron =

fcron
- Developer(s): Thibault Godouet
- Stable release: 3.2.1 / June 26, 2016; 8 years ago
- Preview release: 3.3.1 (dev) / December 5, 2021; 3 years ago
- Repository: github.com/yo8192/fcron
- Written in: C
- Operating system: Linux, FreeBSD
- Platform: POSIX
- Type: Command scheduler
- License: GPL v2
- Website: fcron.free.fr

fcron is a computer program with a GNU General Public License (GNU GPL) license that performs periodic command scheduling. It has been developed on Linux and should work on POSIX systems. As with Anacron, it does not assume that the system is running continuously, and can run in systems that do not run all the time or regularly. It aims to replace Vixie-cron and Anacron with a single integrated program, providing many features missing from the original Cron daemon.

Some of the supported options permit:

- run jobs one by one
- set the max system load average value under which the job should be run
- set a nice value for a job
- run jobs at fcron's startup if they should have been run during system down time
- mail user to tell them a job has not run and why
- run fcron by scripts
- run several instances of fcron simultaneously
- have fcron exit after it has run the pending jobs

== See also ==
- Cron
- List of Unix commands
