= Hungarian Unix Portal =

hup.hu
- Website type: News, Review
- Available in: Hungarian
- Owner: Gábor Micsko
- Website: hup.hu
- IPv6 support: Yes
- Commercial: No
- Launched: 2000
- Current status: Active

Since 2000 the Hungarian Unix Portal (HUP), founded by Gábor Micsko a.k.a. trey, is the largest Hungarian UNIX/Linux/BSD system administrators' webpage.

HUP's aim is to join with the Hungarian free software community. Members of HUP can discuss and resolve problems about *NIX systems. The main language of HUP is Hungarian.

HUP hosts the HupWiki, which is the most important wiki about free software and *NIX systems in Hungary. HupWiki consists of over 1000 articles and documentations.

HUP (also known as: portal.fsn.hu) has been associated with the Free Software Network (a.k.a. FSN.hu) foundation. FSN's goal is to distribute free software, to help people and organizations using them and to provide infrastructural background and other services. The best known service is the file server called ftp.fsn.hu, which is Hungary's largest (by traffic), independent free software distribution point. Its biggest daily traffic was 875 GB so far. The services of the machine can be used by anyone 24 hours a day.

== See also ==
- SIGHUP: terminal line hangup
- LWN.net
