= Batch processing =

Processing a software job non-interactively

In computing, batch processing is the running of a software job in an automated and unattended way. A user schedules a job to run and then waits for a processing system to run it. Typically, a job is scheduled to run at a configured time of day or when an event occurs or when computer resources are available.

== History ==
The term "batch processing" originates in the traditional classification of methods of production as job production (one-off production), batch production (production of a "batch" of multiple items at once, one stage at a time), and flow production (mass production, all stages in process at once).

=== Early history ===
Early computers were capable of running only one program at a time. Each user had sole control of the machine for a scheduled period of time. They would arrive at the computer with program and data, often on punched paper cards and magnetic or paper tape, and would load their program, run and debug it, and carry off their output when done.

As computers became faster the setup and takedown time became a larger percentage of available computer time. Programs called monitors, the forerunners of operating systems, were developed which could process a series, or "batch", of programs, often from magnetic tape prepared offline. The monitor would be loaded into the computer and run the first job of the batch. At the end of the job it would regain control and load and run the next until the batch was complete. Often the output of the batch would be written to magnetic tape and printed or punched offline. Examples of monitors were IBM's Fortran Monitor System, SOS (Share Operating System), and finally IBSYS for IBM's 709x systems in 1960.

=== Third-generation systems ===
Third-generation computers capable of multiprogramming began to appear in the 1960s. Instead of running one batch job at a time, these systems can have multiple batch programs running at the same time in order to keep the system as busy as possible. One or more programs might be awaiting input, one actively running on the CPU, and others generating output. Instead of offline input and output, programs called spoolers read jobs from cards, disk, or remote terminals and place them in a job queue to be run. In order to prevent deadlocks the job scheduler needs to know each job's resource requirements—memory, magnetic tapes, mountable disks, etc., so various scripting languages were developed to supply this information in a structured way. Probably the most well-known is IBM's Job Control Language (JCL). Job schedulers select jobs to run according to a variety of criteria, including priority, memory size, etc. Remote batch is a procedure for submitting batch jobs from remote terminals, often equipped with a punch card reader and a line printer. Sometimes asymmetric multiprocessing is used to spool batch input and output for one or more large computers using an attached smaller and less-expensive system, as in the IBM System/360 Attached Support Processor. (Note: Use of satellite computers for this purpose began earlier, e.g., in IBM 7094/7044 Direct Coupled System.)

=== Later history ===
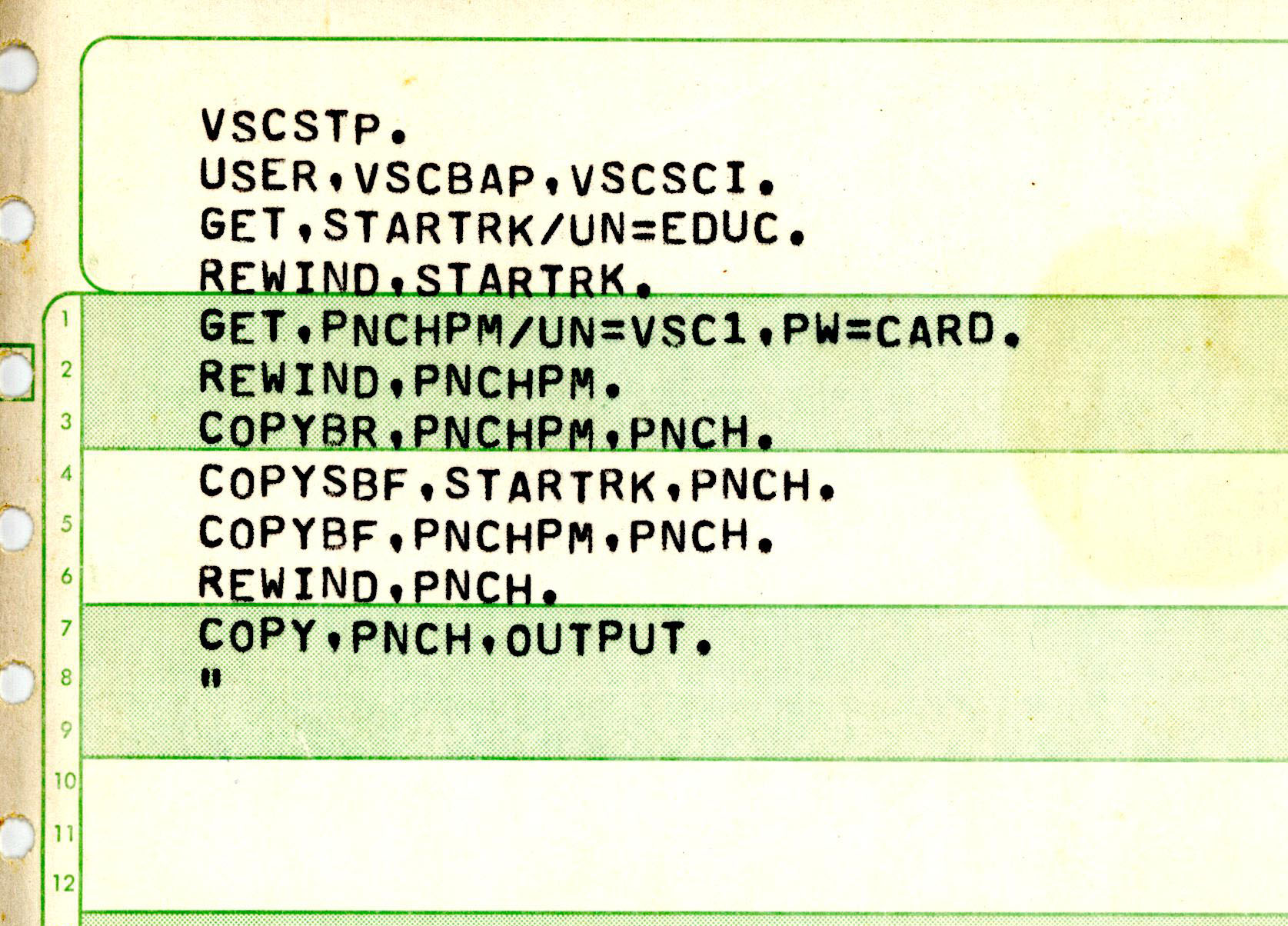
CDC NOS batch file to get the file STARTRK and output it to the card punch

The first general-purpose time-sharing system, Compatible Time-Sharing System (CTSS), was compatible with batch processing. This facilitated transitioning from batch processing to interactive computing.

From the late 1960s onwards, interactive computing such as via text-based computer terminal interfaces (as in Unix shells or read–eval–print loops), and later graphical user interfaces became common. Non-interactive computation, both one-off jobs such as compilation, and processing of multiple items in batches, became retrospectively referred to as batch processing, and the term batch job (in early use often "batch of jobs") became common. Early use is particularly found at the University of Michigan, around the Michigan Terminal System (MTS).

Although timesharing did exist, its use was not robust enough for corporate data processing; none of this was related to the earlier unit record equipment, which was human-operated.

=== Ongoing ===
Non-interactive computation remains widespread in computing, both for general data processing and for system "housekeeping" tasks (using system software). A high-level program (executing multiple programs, with some additional "glue" logic) is today most often called a script, and written in scripting languages, particularly shell scripts for system tasks; in IBM PC DOS and MS-DOS this is instead known as a batch file. That includes UNIX-based computers, Microsoft Windows, macOS (whose foundation is the BSD Unix kernel), and even smartphones. A running script, particularly one executed from an interactive login session, is often known as a job, but that term is used very ambiguously.

"There is no direct counterpart to z/OS batch processing in PC or UNIX systems. Batch jobs are typically executed at a scheduled time or on an as-needed basis. Perhaps the closest comparison is with processes run by an at or cron command in UNIX, although the differences are significant."

== Modern systems ==
Batch applications are still critical in most organizations in large part because many common business processes are amenable to batch processing. While online systems can also function when manual intervention is not desired, they are not typically optimized to perform high-volume, repetitive tasks. Therefore, even new systems usually contain one or more batch applications for updating information at the end of the day, generating reports, printing documents, and other non-interactive tasks that must complete reliably within certain business deadlines.

Some applications are amenable to flow processing, namely those that only need data from a single input at once (not totals, for instance): start the next step for each input as it completes the previous step. In this case flow processing lowers latency for individual inputs, allowing them to be completed without waiting for the entire batch to finish. However, many applications require data from all records, notably computations such as totals. In this case the entire batch must be completed before one has a usable result: partial results are not usable.

Modern batch applications make use of modern batch frameworks such as Jem The Bee, Spring Batch or implementations of JSR 352 written for Java, and other frameworks for other programming languages, to provide the fault tolerance and scalability required for high-volume processing. In order to ensure high-speed processing, batch applications are often integrated with grid computing solutions to partition a batch job over a large number of processors, although there are significant programming challenges in doing so. High volume batch processing places particularly heavy demands on system and application architectures as well. Architectures that feature strong input/output performance and vertical scalability, including modern mainframe computers, tend to provide better batch performance than alternatives.

Scripting languages became popular as they evolved along with batch processing.

== Batch window ==
A batch window is "a period of less-intensive online activity", when the computer system is able to run batch jobs without interference from, or with, interactive online systems.

A bank's end-of-day (EOD) jobs require the concept of cutover, where transaction and data are cut off for a particular day's batch activity ("deposits after 3 PM will be processed the next day").

As requirements for online systems uptime expanded to support globalization, the Internet, and other business needs, the batch window shrank and increasing emphasis was placed on techniques that would require online data to be available for a maximum amount of time.

== Batch size ==
The batch size refers to the number of work units to be processed within one batch operation. Some examples are:

- The number of lines from a file to load into a database before committing the transaction.
- The number of messages to dequeue from a queue.
- The number of requests to send within one payload.

== Common batch processing usage ==
- Efficient bulk database updates and automated transaction processing, as contrasted to interactive online transaction processing (OLTP) applications. The extract, transform, load (ETL) step in populating data warehouses is inherently a batch process in most implementations.
- Performing bulk operations on digital images such as resizing, conversion, watermarking, or otherwise editing a group of image files.
- Converting computer files from one format to another. For example, a batch job may convert proprietary and legacy files to common standard formats for end-user queries and display.
- Training Machine Learning models. For example, an e-commerce website might want to process customer transactions in an hourly batch to update the model that produces related product recommendations, in order to save computational resources.

== Notable batch scheduling and execution environments ==
The IBM mainframe z/OS operating system or platform has a set of batch processing facilities. Such systems commonly support hundreds or even thousands of concurrent online and batch tasks within a single operating system image. Technologies that aid concurrent batch and online processing include Job Control Language (JCL), scripting languages such as REXX, Job Entry Subsystem (JES2 and JES3), Workload Manager (WLM), Automatic Restart Manager (ARM), Resource Recovery Services (RRS), IBM Db2 data sharing, Parallel Sysplex, performance optimizations such as HiperDispatch, I/O channel architecture, and others.

The Unix programs cron, at, and batch (today batch is a variant of at) allow for complex scheduling of jobs. Windows has a job scheduler. Most high-performance computing clusters use batch processing to maximize cluster usage.

== See also ==
- Background process
- Batch file
- Batch renaming – to rename lots of files automatically without human intervention, in order to save time and effort
- BatchPipes – for utility that increases batch performance
- Processing modes
- Production support – for batch job/schedule/stream support
- High-throughput computing
