= Agentless data collection =

Data collection method

In the field of information technology, agentless data collection involves collecting data from computers without installing any new agents on them.
