= AvantGo =

Technology company founded 1997

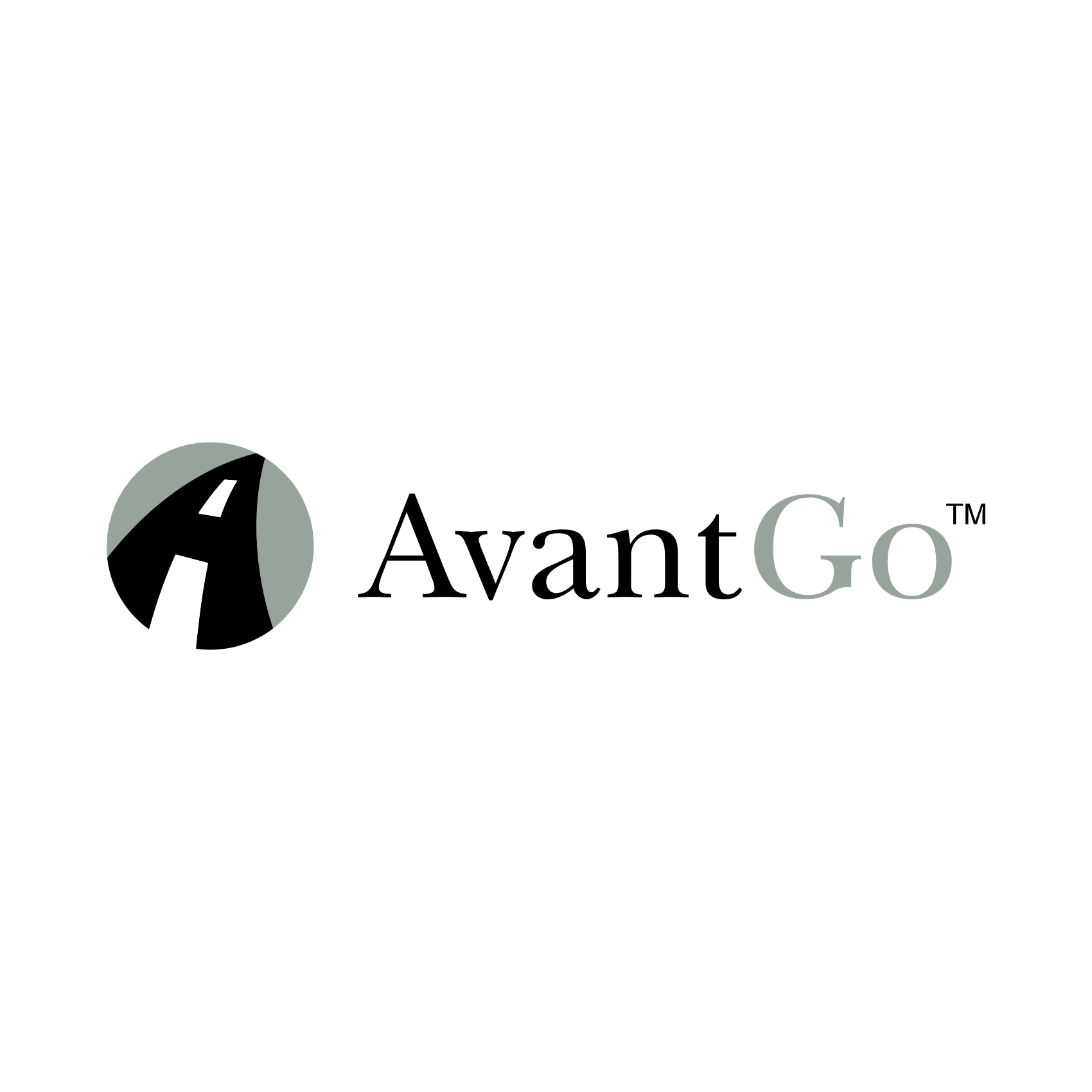
- Type: Former
- Industry: Technology
- Founded: 1997
- Defunct: 2009
- Fate: Acquired by Sybase
- Products: Web browser for mobile devices
- Services: Offline content synchronization
- Number of employees: 400 (at peak)
- Parent: Sybase, Inc. (2002–2009)

AvantGo was a technology company focused on bringing a full W3C-compliant browser experience to intermittently-connected mobile devices such as the personal digital assistants (PDAs) and extremely early smartphones of that time period. Their browser could work with a live internet connection, but their core technology was the ability to sync web pages (including forms and JavaScript) to the device, allow the user to interact with them even while off-line, and then forward any results (primarily HTTP POST messages) the next time the device synced.

Despite this, the company is primarily remembered for their proof-of-technology demo service, which allowed users to set up a free account and subscribe to web pages and "content channels", which they could then view offline. While the free service was quite popular, it was not successful in marketing the technology to the intended customers. Eventually, AvantGo was acquired by Sybase, Inc. in a white-knight transaction; the free public service was never monetized profitably and was eventually shut down.

== History ==
AvantGo was founded in 1997 and was based in San Mateo, California. It quickly grew to nearly 400 employees and went public on September 28, 2000. Its IPO price was $12 per share and it closed the day up $8 at $20 per share with a market cap of nearly $1 billion. On Dec 12, 2002, the company was sold to Sybase for $38 million, only a bit more than the cash it had on hand.

Starting in June 2008, AvantGo displayed on their main page and on the device web browser that all synchronization and channel services would be shut down on June 30, 2009.

In 2009, the AvantGo service was owned and operated by Sybase 365, a subsidiary of Sybase, Inc. It became a managed ad insertion platform focused on SMS ad campaigns. Sybase was acquired by SAP in 2010; SAP no longer uses the AvantGo or Sybase brand names.
