= Disown (Unix) =

Unix builtin command

In the Unix shells ksh, bash, fish and zsh, the disown builtin command is used to remove jobs from the job table, or to mark jobs so that a SIGHUP signal is not sent to them if the parent shell receives it (e.g. if the user logs out).

== See also ==
- nohup, a POSIX command to ignore the HUP (hangup) signal
