= Jetadmin =

Jetadmin was a computer program produced by Hewlett-Packard for administration of network printers. It ran on the following operating systems:

- Windows 3.x, 95, 98, NT, and 2000
- HP-UX 9.x and lower, 10.x, 11.x
- Solaris 2.4 and lower, 2.5, 2.5.1, 2.6
- SunOS
- OS/2
- DOS

Hewlett-Packard declared HP Jetadmin obsolete as of 31 Jan 2002. It has been replaced with HP Web Jetadmin.
