= Production support =

Support for IT applications used by end users

Production support covers the practices and disciplines of supporting the IT systems and applications which are currently being used by an organization, the organizations customers, and its end users. A production support analyst or engineer is responsible for monitoring the production environments, servers, scheduled jobs, incident management and receiving incidents and requests from end-users, analyzing these and either responding to the end user with a solution or escalating it to other IT teams. These teams may include developers, system engineers and database administrators.

== See also ==
- Information technology
- ITIL
- Production environment
