= TRNA (cytidine56-2'-O)-methyltransferase =

Enzyme

tRNA (cytidine56-2'-O)-methyltransferase

Identifiers
- EC no.: 2.1.1.206

Databases
- IntEnz: IntEnz view
- BRENDA: BRENDA entry
- ExPASy: NiceZyme view
- KEGG: KEGG entry
- MetaCyc: metabolic pathway
- PRIAM: profile
- PDB structures: RCSB PDB PDBe PDBsum
Search
- PMC: articles
- PubMed: articles
- NCBI: proteins

tRNA (cytidine56-2'-O)-methyltransferase (EC 2.1.1.206, aTrm^{56}, tRNA ribose 2'-O-methyltransferase aTrm^{56}, PAB1040 (gene)) is an enzyme with systematic name S-adenosyl-L-methionine:tRNA (cytidine56-2'-O)-methyltransferase. This enzyme catalyses the following chemical reaction

S-adenosyl-L-methionine + cytidine^{56} in tRNA $\rightleftharpoons$ S-adenosyl-L-homocysteine + 2'-O-methylcytidine^{56} in tRNA

The archaeal enzyme specifically catalyses the S-adenosyl-L-methionine dependent 2'-O-ribose methylation of cytidine at position 56 in tRNA transcripts.
