= At (command) =

Task scheduling shell command

at
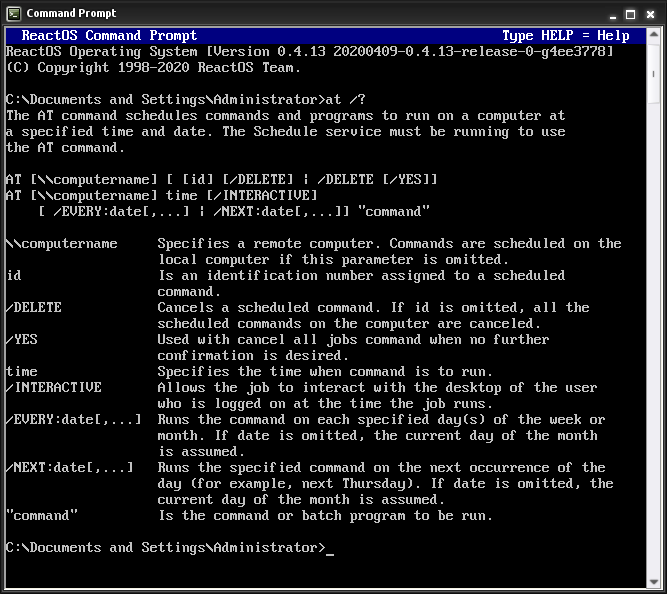
- The ReactOS at command
- Developers: Thomas Koenig, Microsoft, ReactOS Contributors
- Written in: Unix-like, ReactOS: C
- Operating system: Unix-like, Windows, ReactOS
- Type: Command
- License: Windows: Proprietary software ReactOS: GPLv2

at is a shell command for scheduling commands to be executed once, at a future time. The command was originally developed for use with Unix and is now available on a variety of Unix-like systems, as well as Windows, and ReactOS.

Microsoft deprecated at in Windows 8 and Server 2012. It was removed in Windows Insider Preview Build 29671.

== Variants ==
=== Unix-like ===
On Unix-like operating systems, at reads a series of commands from standard input and collects them into one "at-job" which is carried out at a date and time that is specified as part of the command. The job inherits the current environment, so that it is executed in the same working directory and with the same environment variables set as when it was scheduled. at differs from cron, which is used for scheduling recurring execution, e.g., once an hour, every Tuesday, January 1 every year, etc..

As with cron, many Unix systems allow the administrator to restrict access to the at command. at can be made to send E-mail to a user when done carrying out a scheduled job, can use more than one job queue, and can read a list of commands to execute out from a file instead of standard input. The Linux at command was mostly written by Thomas Koenig.

The batch command can be used instead of at to only run scheduled jobs if the system's load average is below a certain value.

==== Examples ====
A sample command to compile a C program at 11:45 a.m. on January 31 would be:

$ echo "cc -o foo foo.c" | at 1145 jan 31

or

$ at 1145 jan 31
at> cc -o foo foo.c
at> ^D #(press Control-D while at the beginning of a line)

The atq program lists the currently queued jobs, while atrm removes jobs from the queue:

$ atq
1234 2011-08-12 11:45 cc -o foo foo.c user
$ atrm 1234 
$ atq
$

In some Unix-like computer operating systems, it uses a daemon, atd, which waits in the background periodically checking the list of jobs to do and executing those at their scheduled time on behalf of at.

=== Windows and ReactOS ===
In addition to the graphical user interface for Windows Task Scheduler in Control Panel, Windows provides an at shell command that schedules operations to run at a specified time and date (similar to cron). It is available since Windows NT, but is now deprecated in favor of schtasks. It can only be used when the Schedule service is running. When used without parameters, at lists scheduled commands. at cannot access tasks created or modified by Control Panel or schtasks.exe. Also, tasks created with at are not interactive by default; interactivity needs to be explicitly requested.

The ReactOS implementation is based on the Windows implementation. It was developed by Eric Kohl and is licensed under the GPLv2.

==== Examples ====
To use at, the user must be a member of the local Administrators group.

The command-syntax is:

at [\\ComputerName] [{[ID] [/delete]|/delete [/yes]}]

at [[\\ComputerName] hours:minutes [/interactive] [{/every:date[,...]|/next:date[,...]}] command]

\\ ComputerName
This parameter specifies a remote computer. If it is omitted, at schedules the commands and programs on the local computer.
ID
This parameter specifies the identification number assigned to a scheduled command.
/delete
This parameter cancels a scheduled command. If ID is omitted, all of the scheduled commands on the computer are canceled.
/yes
This parameter answers yes to all queries from the system when you delete scheduled events.
hours : minutes
This parameter specifies the time when to run the command.
/interactive
This parameter allows the given command to interact with the desktop of the user who is logged on at the time command runs.
/every:
This parameter runs the given command on every specified day or days of the week or month.
date
This parameter specifies the date when to run the given command. One or more days of the week can be specified. If date is omitted, at uses the current day of the month.
/next:
This parameter runs command on the next occurrence of the day.
command
This parameter specifies the Windows command, program (that is, .exe or .com file), or batch program (that is, .bat or .cmd file) that will be run.
/?
Displays help for the command.

== See also ==
- cron, runs scheduled tasks at regular intervals
- Launchd, Apple’s init software which handles at in macOS
- List of POSIX commands
- schtasks (Microsoft command shell)
- systemd, incorporates atd
