= Microsoft Management Console =

Component of Microsoft Windows

- Windows Management Console running in Windows 11, with Device Manager snap-in loaded
- Developer: Microsoft
- Operating system: Microsoft Windows
- Type: System configuration application
- License: Proprietary

Microsoft Management Console (MMC) is a component of Microsoft Windows that provides system administrators and advanced users an interface for configuring and monitoring the system. It was first introduced as an optional component of Windows NT 4.0 via the Option Pack update in late 1997, which includes several features that were slated for release with Windows 2000. It later came shipped with Windows beginning with the aforementioned operating system, and has remained available in many other Windows versions since.

== Snap-ins and consoles ==
Snap-ins listed in the management console

The management console can host Component Object Model components called snap-ins. Most of Microsoft's administration tools are implemented as MMC snap-ins. Third parties can also implement their own snap-ins using the MMC's application programming interfaces published on the Microsoft Developer Network's web site.

Snap-ins are registered in the [HKEY_CLASSES_ROOT]\{CLSID} and [HKEY_LOCAL_MACHINE\Software\Microsoft\MMC\Snapins] registry keys. A snap-in combined with MMC is called a management saved console, which is a file with .msc extension and can be launched using this syntax: mmc path \ filename.msc [/a] [/64] [/32].

=== Common snap-ins ===
The most prolific MMC component, Computer Management, appears in the "Administrative Tools" folder in the Control Panel, under "System and Security" in Category View. Computer Management actually consists of a collection of MMC snap-ins, including the Device Manager, Disk Defragmenter, Internet Information Services (if installed), Disk Management, Event Viewer, Local Users and Groups (except in the home editions of Windows), Shared Folders, Services snap-in, for managing Windows services, Certificates and other tools. Computer Management can also be pointed at another Windows machine altogether, allowing for monitoring and configuration of other computers on the local network that the user has access to.

Other MMC snap-ins in common use include:

- Microsoft Exchange Server (up to version 2010)
- Active Directory Users and Computers, Domains and Trusts, and Sites and Services
- Group Policy Management, including the Local Security Policy snap-in; included on all versions of Windows 2000 and later (Home editions of Microsoft Windows disable this snap-in)
- Performance snap-in, for monitoring system performance and metrics

== Version history ==
- MMC 1.0, shipped with Windows NT 4.0 Option Pack.
- MMC 1.1, shipped with SQL Server 7.0 and Systems Management Server 2.0, also available as a download for Windows 9x and Windows NT. New features:
  - Snap-in taskpads
  - Wizard-style property sheets
  - Ability to load extensions to a snap-in at run-time
  - HTML Help support
- MMC 1.2, shipped with Windows 2000. New features:
  - Support for Windows Installer and Group Policy
  - Filtered views
  - Exporting list views to a text file
  - Persistence of user-set column layouts (i.e. widths, ordering, visibility and sorting of lists)
- MMC 2.0, shipped with Windows XP and Windows Server 2003. New features:
  - Operating system-defined visual styles
  - Automation object model, allowing the capabilities of an MMC snap-in to be used programmatically from outside MMC itself (e.g. from a script)
  - 64-bit snap-ins
  - Console Taskpads
  - View Extensions
  - Multilanguage User Interface help files
- MMC 3.0, shipped with Windows Vista, Windows Server 2003 SP2, Windows XP SP3 and all versions of Windows up to (and including) Windows 11. Also downloadable for Windows XP SP2 and Windows Server 2003 SP1. New features:
  - A new "Actions pane", displayed on the right-hand side of the MMC user interface that displays available actions for currently-selected node
  - Support for developing snap-ins with the .NET Framework, including Windows Forms
  - Reduced amount of code required to create a snap-in
  - Improved debugging capabilities
  - Asynchronous user interface model (MMC 3.0 snap-ins only)
  - True Color Icon Support (Windows Vista Only)
  - New Add/Remove Snap-in UI
  - DEP is always enforced. All snap-ins must be DEP-aware.

== See also ==
- List of Microsoft Windows components
- Microsoft Windows
- Windows PowerShell
