= Dynamic Logical Partitioning =

Logical partition technology in IBM POWER servers

Dynamic Logical Partitioning (DLPAR), is the capability of a logical partition (LPAR) to be reconfigured dynamically, without having to shut down the operating system that runs in the LPAR. DLPAR enables memory, CPU capacity, and I/O interfaces to be moved nondisruptively between LPARs within the same server.

DLPAR has been supported by the operating systems AIX and IBM i on almost all POWER4 and follow-on POWER systems since then. The Linux kernel for POWER also supported DLPAR, but its dynamic reconfiguration capabilities were limited to CPU capacity and PCI devices, but not memory. In October 2009, seven years after the AIX announcement of DLPAR of memory, CPU and IO slots, Linux finally added the capability to DLPAR memory on POWER systems. The fundamentals of DLPAR are described in the IBM Systems Journal paper titled: "Dynamic reconfiguration: Basic building blocks for autonomic computing on IBM pSeries Servers.

Later on, the POWER5 processor added enhanced DLPAR capabilities, including micro-partitioning: up to 10 LPARs can be configured per processor, with a single multiprocessor server supporting a maximum of 254 LPARs (and thus up to 254 independent operating system instances).

There are many interesting applications of DLPAR capabilities. Primarily, it is used to build agile infrastructures, or to automate hardware system resource allocation, planning, and provisioning. This in turn results in increased system utilization. For example, memory, processor or I/O slots can be added, removed or moved to another LPAR, without rebooting the operating system or the application running in an LPAR. IBM DB2 is such application (http://www.ibm.com/developerworks/eserver/articles/db2_dlpar.html), it is aware of the DLPAR events and automatically tunes itself to changing LPAR resources.

The IBM Z mainframes and their operating systems, including Linux on IBM Z, support even more sophisticated forms of dynamic LPARs. Relevant LPAR-related features on those mainframe platforms include Intelligent Resource Director, Sysplex, Parallel Sysplex, Geographically Dispersed Parallel Sysplex, and HiperSockets. The System z9 supports up to 60 LPARs on a single server, but mainframes also support an additional level of virtualization using z/VM with the ability to support thousands of operating system instances on a single server.

== See also ==
- Virtualization
  - Operating system-level virtualization
  - Hypervisor
  - HiperSocket
- Logical partition (virtual computing platform)
  - Micro-Partitioning
