= UNIX System Services =

UNIX for IBM mainframes

- Developer: IBM
- OS family: UNIX - POSIX
- Working state: Current
- Source model: Closed source
- Initial release: 1998; 28 years ago (Name changed from OpenEdition to OS/390 UNIX System Services)
- Latest release: Version 3.1 (V3R1) / September 29, 2023; 3 years ago
- Marketing target: Enterprise / Mainframes
- Available in: English and most other languages
- Supported platforms: z/Architecture
- License: Proprietary
- Official website: z/OS UNIX System Services

z/OS UNIX System Services (z/OS UNIX, or informally USS) is a base element of z/OS. z/OS UNIX is a certified UNIX operating system implementation (XPG4 UNIX 95) optimized for mainframe architecture. It is the first UNIX 95 to not be derived from the AT&T source code. Through integration with the rest of z/OS, additional Time Sharing Option (TSO) commands are available alongside the usual UNIX services, making it possible to process UNIX files using ISPF. Extensions in JCL make it possible to use these files in batch processing.

== Overview ==
UNIX System Services allows UNIX applications from other platforms to run on IBM System z mainframes running z/OS. In many cases only a recompile is necessary, although additional effort may be advisable for z/OS integration (such as SMP/E installation support). While z/OS UNIX supports ASCII and Unicode, and there's no technical requirement to modify ASCII and Unicode UNIX applications, many z/OS users often prefer EBCDIC support in their applications including those running in z/OS UNIX. Consequently, z/OS UNIX provides application and administrator services for converting to/from EBCDIC. Programs running under z/OS UNIX have full, secure access to the other internal functions of z/OS. Database access (Db2 via Call Attach) is one example of how z/OS UNIX can access services found elsewhere in z/OS. Naturally such programs cannot be ported to non-mainframe platforms without rewriting if they use these z/OS-specific services. Conversely, if a program adheres to UNIX standards such as POSIX and ANSI C, it will be easier to move it between different UNIX operating systems including z/OS UNIX.

The file systems for z/OS UNIX (the older HFS with DFSMS/MVS Version 1 Release 2 and the now preferred zFS), which support UNIX-style long filenames, appear as datasets (Note: HFS has a special dataset type; zFS uses a VSAM Linear Data Set as a container) to the rest of z/OS. Numerous core z/OS subsystems and applications rely on UNIX System Services, including the z/OS Management Facility, XML parsing and generation services, OpenSSH, the IBM HTTP Server for z/OS, the z/OS SDK for Java, and some z/OS PKI services as examples. z/OS UNIX also provides a shell environment, OMVS.

z/OS UNIX's predecessor was an operating system component called OpenEdition MVS, first implemented in MVS/ESA SP 4.3 and enhanced in MVS/ESA 5.1. OpenEdition MVS initially only supported the POSIX standards, but X/OPEN, the predecessor to The Open Group, certified MVS/ESA SP V5.1.

IBM continues to enhance UNIX System Services. Typically every release of z/OS includes enhancements to z/OS UNIX.

== See also ==
- Linux on IBM Z
- OpenSolaris for System z
- UTS (Mainframe UNIX)
