= Terminal Productivity Executive =

Session management software for IBM mainframes, presently sold by CA Technologies

Terminal Productivity Executive (TPX) is a multiple session manager for IBM mainframes. It allows connected users to access resources with a single sign-on. It holds several sessions concurrently, allowing a person to switch among them via the single connection on their physical terminal or terminal emulator application, i.e. telnet. For each session, TPX uses a virtual terminal; users can use it to switch amongst ISPF and SDSF in the Time Sharing Option.

TPX is presently a product of CA Technologies, having been originally developed by Morgan Stanley, and later acquired by Duquesne Systems. TPX is primarily used on z/OS, but a version also exists for z/VM.
