= Hierarchical File System =

Hierarchical File System may refer to

- Hierarchical file system, a file system that is organized hierarchically with a tree structure
- Hierarchical File System (Apple), a file system by Apple used for the classic Mac OS operating system
- Hierarchical File System (IBM MVS), a file system by IBM used for the MVS/ESA, OS/390 and z/OS operating systems

== See also ==
- HFS (disambiguation), various topics using the abbreviation HFS
- HFS Plus (1998–2017), the successor to Apple's Hierarchical File System
