= WLM =

WLM or wlm may refer to or stand for:

== Computing ==
- Windows Live Mail, a former e-mail and newsgroup client included in Microsoft's Windows Live group of services
- Windows Live Messenger, a former free instant message program by Microsoft
- Workload Manager, a resource distributor in IBMs mainframe z/OS operating system

== Organizations and movements ==
- West London Methodist Mission, a British Methodist mission, also known as West London Mission
- White Lives Matter, an international activist group created in response to Black Lives Matter
- Women's Liberation Movement, a former political alignment of women and feminist intellectualism

== Other uses ==
- Middle Welsh, based on its iso language code wlm.
- Wiki Loves Monuments, an annual international photographic competition
- Wolf-Lundmark-Melotte, a barred irregular galaxy
- (WLM), the United States Navy and United States Coast Guard hull classification symbol for Coast Guard coastal buoy tenders
