= AutoMan =

AutoMan is a series of software implementations used both for job scheduling and console operations automation for z/OS. These implementations range from simple scheduling to complex cross systems, monitoring and scheduling.

== Design philosophy ==
The idea behind AutoMan is that a user should have minimum automation software at any given time. These software may be flexible enough to be upgraded according to the needs of the user. AutoMan implements the high level programming language, so that users can make automated decisions at any step of the process. The GAL implementation in AutoMan allows the user to insert high-level language-interpreted code into exit points in the operating systems process.

As an example, AutoMan enables one to name a day or date, and schedule a task in relation to the date given. E.g. if a task is needed "at 9 a.m. on the day after Independence Day", Automan would, in America, define this as the day following American Independence Day, the 5th of July, and schedule the event for that day. However, if the following day would fall on a weekend, Automan would adjust the scheduling of the task to fall on the next work day).

While there are a number of other software products that provide either job scheduling or event automation services, Automan is distinguished by three services that are not provided by any other software. These are as follows:

- the ability to "go back in time," before the program was started and make decisions based on previous events.
- creation of new commands, and re-interpretation and modification of existing commands.
- real time monitoring and scanning of printed output. This last—while very useful in monitoring and reacting to log files, particularly for z/OS web services—is arguably a very dangerous capability.

Because only one language is handling all events and schedules, text being output to a device can be altered after it has been written by an application but before it is printed. Although this function is most often used to send email or pager alerts when certain text is detected in the logging files, there is a danger that unscrupulous or dishonest users could use it to alter the content of reports or documents after they have been created but prior to output.

== See also ==
- Generalized Automation Language
