= Resource Measurement Facility =

Component of IBM z/OS

Resource Measurement Facility (RMF) is a performance monitor for the z/OS operating system. It also collects data for long-term performance analysis and capacity planning. The product consists of the following components:

- Monitor I Data Gatherer which collects data in adjustable intervals from one minute to one hour. The data is written to SMF data sets. RMF Monitor I uses the SMF data record types 70 to 78. In addition a dataspace can be created for the Monitor I data gather in which the most recent RMF SMF data records are buffered so that the RMF Postprocessor can access and process them immediately.
- Monitor III Data Gatherer collects data for short-term and immediate data analysis. The data is collected in intervals ranging from 10 seconds to 10 minutes. The data is written to RMF Monitor III VSAM data sets and internally recorded in a wraparound buffer. The data gatherer also collects some special data for long-term data analysis and records them in RMF SMF records too.
- Monitor II is the original snap shot monitor of RMF. This function also records information in RMF SMF record type 79 and provides interfaces for other reporting functions like SDSF. Over the years this function became less important and is today mostly used as a data provider for other reporting components.
- RMF Postprocessor is the reporting tool for RMF SMF records of type 70 to 78. It generates a big number of tabular and textual reports for long-term data analysis which provide a lot of detail of z/OS and System z performance.
- RMF Spreadsheet Reporter is an extension of the RMF Postprocessor and displays selected data in spreadsheet applications on a workstation.
- RMF Monitor III Reporter is the display tool of RMF Monitor III data. The function is written in ISPF and runs under a TSO session on z/OS. The reporter allows to move forward and backward in time and uses RMF Monitor III in-storage buffer and data sets to access the collected data.
- RMF PM and the RMF Webportal are workstation enhancements for RMF Monitor III. They allow multiple z/OS systems to be displayed in the same data view. RMF PM is a Windows-based application and the Webportal allows the user to display screens using a frames-capable web browser.

RMF is significantly enhanced with every release of z/OS – that is approximately once a year – with other enhancements occurring in support of new hardware, such as new processor models.

== Literature ==
- Pierre Cassier, Raimo Korhonen, Peter Mailand, Michael Teuffel: Effective zSeries Performance Monitoring Using Resource Measurement Facility, IBM Redbook, SG24-6645
- z/OS Resource Measurement Facility: Performance Management Guide, SC33-7992
