= GDPS (disambiguation) =

GDPS may refer to:

- Geographically Dispersed Parallel Sysplex, an extension of Parallel Sysplex of mainframes located, potentially, in different cities.
- Gyan Devi Public School Sr. Secondary, a CBSE affiliated senior secondary school in Gurgaon, Haryana, India.
- Georgia Department of Public Safety, a state body that is responsible for statewide law enforcement and public safety within the U.S. state of Georgia.

== See also ==
- IBM Parallel Sysplex
