= Episode filesystem =

Episode
- Developer: Transarc
- Full name: Episode
- Introduced: 1992; 34 years ago

Structures
- Directory contents: 8KB blocks with hash table
- File allocation: inode-based

Limits
- Max filename length: 256 bytes

Features
- Forks: No
- Attributes: POSIX
- File system permissions: POSIX ACLs
- Transparent compression: No
- Transparent encryption: No

Other
- Supported operating systems: AIX, Solaris, z/OS

Episode is a POSIX compliant file system most commonly known for its use in DCE/DFS file servers. It was designed to achieve the goals of portability, scaling, and to make more efficient use of available system bandwidth. It used a variety of methods to achieve these goals, one of which was its use of metadata logging, designed to enhance the file system's performance.

The Episode file system is the basis for the IBM z/OS POSIX-compatible file system called zFS.
