= TPX =

TPX may refer to:

- TransPennine Express, a train operating company in the United Kingdom
- Terminal Productivity Executive, a session manager for IBM mainframe computers
- A trademark for Polymethylpentene plastic
- Tension pneumothorax, a medical condition of hypoxia due to air accumulating under pressure between the lung and the chest wall
