= XCF =

XCF may refer to:

- XCF (file format), file format of the Gimp image editing computer program
- IBM XCF, a component of the z/OS operating system
- The eXperimental Computing Facility at the UC Berkeley
- Exploratory Cask Finish (XCF), special whiskey bottlings by the Willett Distillery
