= Intelligent Resource Director =

Component of IBM z/OS

On IBM mainframes running the z/OS operating system, Intelligent Resource Director (IRD) is software that automates the management of CPU resources and certain I/O resources.

IRD is implemented as a collaboration between Workload Manager (WLM), a component of z/OS, and the PR/SM Logical Partitioning (LPAR) hypervisor, a function of the mainframe hardware.

Major IRD functions are:

- Logical CP Management - where IRD dynamically varies logical processors on- and off-line. (This does not apply to zIIPs or zAAPs.)
- Weight Management - where IRD dynamically redistributes LPAR weights between members of an LPAR Cluster. (An LPAR Cluster is the set of members of a Parallel Sysplex on a single mainframe footprint.) The total of the weights for the LPAR Cluster remains constant as weights are shifted between the members. (Linux on IBM Z LPARs can also participate in Weight Management.)
- CHPID Management - where logical channel paths are moved between members of an LPAR Cluster.

IRD's objective is to optimise the use of computing resources while enabling WLM to meet its workload goals. So, for example, IRD will not vary offline logical processors to the point where doing so would cause workloads to miss their goals.

== See also ==
- Workload Manager

== Literature ==
- Frank Kyne et al., z/OS Intelligent Resource Director, IBM Redbook, SG24-5952
