= BSAM =

BSAM may refer to:

- Basic sequential access method, a data set access method
- Birendra Sainik Awasiya Mahavidyalaya, the only Nepalese military boarding high school
