= SMF =

SMF may refer to:

== Organizations ==
- Sanjukta Mukti Fouj, a military wing of ULFA, Assam
- Sankat Mochan Foundation, an Indian environmentalist organization
- Santa Maria da Feira Municipality, Portugal
- Scottish Miners' Federation, former trade union
- Senckenberg Museum, Frankfurt collections code
- ShadowMachine Films, Los Angeles, California, US
- Smart & Final (New York Stock Exchange ticker symbol), food stores
- Social Market Foundation, Westminster, London, UK
- Société Mathématique de France (Mathematical Society of France)
- Société mycologique de France, (Mycological Society of France)
- Somaly Mam Foundation, for ending sex slavery
- Special Mobile Force of the Mauritius Police Force
- Svenska Musikerförbundet, the Swedish Musicians' Union

== Science and technology ==
- 5-Sulfoxymethylfurfural, a metabolite of hydroxymethylfurfural
- Service Management Facility, a component of Solaris
- Simple Machines Forum, a web-based forum software
- Single-mode optical fibre, in fibre-optic communication
- Site Master File, a key pharmaceutical manufacturing operations document
- Standard MIDI File, a music file format
- Synthetic mineral fibre, see Mineral wool
- System Management Facilities, a component of z/OS

== Music ==
- Sick Mother Fakers, a punk hardcore band from Belgrade, Serbia
- Stone Metal Fire, a heavy metal band from Bangkok, Thailand

== Other uses ==
- Sacramento International Airport (IATA airport code), outside Sacramento, California, US
- Sua Majestade Fidelíssima, for His/Her Most Faithful Majesty, the Monarch of Portugal's style
