= HFS =

HFS may refer to:

== Businesses and organisations ==
- Croatian Film Association (Croatian: Hrvatski filmski savez)
- Hellenic Fire Service, Greece
- Hospitality Franchise Systems, US

== Computing ==
- Hierarchical file system, a system for organizing directories and files
- Hierarchical File System (Apple), a file system introduced in 1985 for the classic Mac OS
- Hierarchical File System (IBM MVS), a file system introduced in 1993 for MVS/ESA and subsequent operating systems
- Hi Performance FileSystem, a version of the Unix File System used by the HP-UX operating system
- Hardware functionality scan, a security mechanism used in Microsoft Windows operating systems

== Education ==
- Haddonfield Friends School, in New Jersey, United States
- Harford Friends School, in Maryland, United States

== Science and mathematics ==
- Hemifacial spasm, in neurology
- Hereditarily finite set, in mathematics
- Hexafluorosilicic acid, in chemistry
- Hydrogen forward scattering, in materials science
- Hyperfine structure, in physics

== Transportation ==
- French Frigate Shoals Airport, in Hawaii, United States
- Hagfors Airport, in Sweden
- Hatfield and Stainforth railway station, in England

== Other uses ==
- High fructose syrup
- H. F. S. Morgan, founder of the Morgan Motor Company
- WHFS (historic), a former radio station in the Washington, D.C./Baltimore, Maryland

== See also ==
- High Performance File System, a file system for the OS/2 operating system
- HFSS (disambiguation)
- HF (disambiguation), for the singular of HFs
