= European Union IBM competition cases =

On July 26, 2010, the European Commission announced two separate antitrust investigations into International Business Machines (IBM). Both cases were related to alleged abuse of IBM's dominant position in the mainframe market. The first case followed complaints by mainframe emulator vendors T3 Technologies and TurboHercules, later joined by Neon Enterprise Software, and focused on the alleged tying of IBM's mainframe hardware to its mainframe operating system, potentially precluding customers from the execution of mission critical mainframe applications on non-IBM servers. The second case was an investigation begun on the EC's own initiative that looked into IBM's alleged discriminatory behaviour towards competing suppliers of mainframe maintenance services.

In its initial reaction to the EC's decision, IBM said that the allegations had been brought forward by "satellite proxies" of rival Microsoft. (Microsoft was the subject of a series of EU antitrust cases.) IBM also noted that the company holds numerous U.S. patents (some of which have also been filed in Europe) on its mainframe hardware technologies to protect its ongoing billions of dollars in new mainframe technology investments, that the vendors did not seek and did not pay for licenses to those patents, and that IBM should not be required to support infringement of its own patents.

== Resolution ==
After losing related court cases in the U.S. against IBM, T3 and Neon withdrew their European Commission complaints in August, 2011. TurboHercules also withdrew its complaint. On September 20, 2011, the European Commission closed its investigation without action into alleged operating system and hardware tying. Separately, IBM agreed to provide mainframe spare parts and certain technical information for five years to maintenance firms. The Commission provisionally approved of IBM's proposed solution and, after a comment period, issued final approval in December, 2011.
