= HF =

HF, Hf or hf can refer to:

== Arts and entertainment ==
- HammerFall, a Swedish power metal band
- Hard-Fi, an English indie rock band
- Star Trek: Hidden Frontier, a long-running Star Trek fan-fiction series
- Hi-hat with foot, part of a drum kit

== Business ==
- Hlutafélag (hf.), a form of limited liability company in Iceland
- Hapag-Lloyd Flug, a former German airline (IATA code) doing business as TUIfly
- Air Côte d'Ivoire, an Ivorian airline (IATA code)

== Education ==
- Higher Preparatory Examination (HF) (Højere Forberedelseseksamen), a Danish examination programme
- Heraldo Filipino, the student newspaper of De La Salle University-Dasmariñas, Cavite, Philippines
- Homewood-Flossmoor High School, Flossmoor, Illinois

== Organizations ==
- Humanity First, an international charitable organisation, which focuses on immediate disaster response and long-term development
- Health trust (Helseforetak), a Norwegian hospital enterprise
- Heritage Front, a white supremacist and Canadian Nationalist group
- Hudobný fond (Music Fund Slovakia), a presenter of the ZAI Awards

== Science and technology ==
=== Biology and medicine ===
- Heart failure
- Holstein Friesian cattle, HF, a breed of cattle
- Steve Biko Academic Hospital, a hospital in Pretoria, South Africa, formerly called H F Verwoerd Hospital
- Hippocampal formation, region in the brain

=== Chemistry ===
- Hafnium, symbol Hf, a chemical element
- Hartree–Fock method, a calculation scheme in the field of computational chemistry
- Hydrogen fluoride, HF, a diatomic compound which can dissolve in water to form hydrofluoric acid, a highly corrosive solution
- Hydrofluoric acid, HF_{(aq)}, a solution of hydrogen fluoride (HF) in water

=== Other uses in science and technology ===
- Handsfree, equipment that can be used without the use of hands
- Helicon Filter, photo editing software
- Helicon Focus, a photo-merging program used to increase depth of field or make panoramas
- High frequency, the ITU 3–30 MHz radio frequency range (band)
- Hilbert function of a graded algebra

== Sport ==
- Half-Forward, an Australian Rules football position
- Heinz Field, a stadium in Pittsburgh, Pennsylvania and the home of the Pittsburgh Steelers
- Holmesdale Fanatics, a former ultras group supporting Crystal Palace, a football club in London

== People ==
- H. F. Verwoerd, a South African Prime Minister
- Harrison Ford, American film actor

== Other uses ==
- Have Fun, in video game slang
- High five, celebratory hand gesture
- Hotfix, a software patch to temporarily fix a bug in a product

== See also ==
- High fidelity
- HFS (disambiguation)
