= SPF/PC =

PC-based text editor imitating mainframe ISPF

SPF/PC is an MS-DOS-based text editor and file manager designed to have an interface that was familiar to those using mainframe SPF and ISPF.

Later Microsoft Windows-based versions were named SPF/SE and SPF/SE 365. A version for OS/2 named SPF/2 was also offered. SPF/SE and SPF/SE 365 were released as freeware in 2022 after the death of Tim Tetiva, the author of SPF/PC and SPF/SE.

== Overview ==
SPF/PC was introduced by and successors sold by Command Technology Corporation. Similar to IBM's mainframe based ISPF and is able to edit ASCII and EBCDIC text file as a complete integrated applications development environment (IDE). Typically used for editing source code, invoking compilers, linkers, and debuggers, in a variety of programming languages, such as COBOL, Fortran, and C++.

== Features ==
- Auto source code backup
- Auto save during edit
- Background/Foreground compiler and utility support
- Edit small or large files (up to 1Gig)
- Edit ASCII and EBCDIC text files
- Command Line Interface (CLI)
- File browser with keyword colorization
- File manager
- File conversion utilities
- COBOL source code support
- Hex editor
- IBM (3270) and PC command keys
- IBM ISPF Style Panels
- Keyboard equivalents provided for all mouse operations
- Language line numbering support
- Language profile support
- Line, column and bounds oriented copy, cut, data shift, find, paste, sort with picture strings
- Line lengths (records) up to 64,000 characters in fixed or variable formats
- Line exclude, change, find, flip, locate, not-exclude
- Merge error files created by compilers into source code as notes (type of comment)
- Multilevel Undo and Redo
- Multiple sequential complex command execution - repeatable with exclude and not-exclude abilities
- Print file, screen or highlighted text
- Simple and advanced text/file find/replace (search through thousands of files for text)
- Sort file lists and text/data
- Sort A-Z, Z-A, bounding by columns, line labels etc.
- Split screen (horizontal and vertical)
- File and Directory comparison
- Support for DOS/Windows/Linux/Unix EOL and EOF markers
- User enhancements - add, create, modify dialogs, functions, menus and screens
- User definable fonts
- User definable editor color schemes including several 3270 schemes
- User definable file profiles including EOL, EOF, Line Length etc.
- User definable cursor, half page and page scrolling
- User switchable editor line numbers or not
- User definable keyboard and keyboard macros
- User modifiable help system

== Macro/Scripting Language ==
SPF/SE 365 uses a C like macro/scripting language.

All versions of SPF have the ability to call any interpreter (PHP, BASIC, Powershell, etc.) from within the editor allowing text processing and OS command calls. SPF/SE does not have the REXX interface that SPF/PC had.
