= HFSS =

HFSS or HfSS may refer to:

- High-frequency structure simulator, a high frequency electromagnetic simulation software, see Ansys HFSS
- High in fat, sugar and salt, food products that are high in fat, sugar or salt, see junk food
- Hochschule für Sozialpädagogik und Sozialökonomie, a predecessor of the City University of Applied Sciences in Bremen, Germany
- Heart failure survival score, a multivariable predictive index that risk-stratifies patients with chronic heart failure referred for heart transplantation

== See also ==
- HFS (disambiguation)
