= Micro-Partitioning =

Micro-Partitioning, also known as shared processor partitioning, is a form of logical partitioning which was introduced by IBM on systems using the POWER5 processor. It only differs from a dedicated processor partition in the way CPU utilization is configured and managed by the POWER Hypervisor (PHYP) firmware. All IBM POWER5 and POWER6 systems are partitioned and will run "on top" of the PHYP.

The POWER Hypervisor controls time slicing, management of all hardware interrupts, dynamic movement of resources across multiple operating systems, and dispatching of logical partition workloads.

When a shared processor partition is activated by the PHYP, the logical partition (LPAR) is guaranteed a certain processing capacity, if needed, and a number of virtual processors, based on configuration and current availability. The processing capacity is drawn from a pool of shared processor resources.

The minimum processing capacity per processor is 1/10 of a physical processor core, with a further granularity of 1/100. The PHYP uses a 10 ms time slicing dispatch window for scheduling all shared processor partitions' virtual processor queues to the PHYP physical processor core queues. A shared processor partition can be either capped or uncapped. A capped partition can never exceed the currently configured processing capacity, whereas an uncapped partition can exceed the currently configured processing capacity up to 100% of the number of the currently configured virtual processors.

If the shared processor partition is DLPAR capable, the number of virtual processors and processing capacity can be altered dynamically for the partition.

== See also ==
- VM (operating system)
