= ZFS (z/OS file system) =

POSIX-compatible filesystem for IBM z/OS

zFS
- Developer: IBM
- Full name: z/OS File System
- Introduced: 1995 with DCE DFS Local File System for MVS/ESA V5R2.2

Other
- Supported operating systems: z/OS (all releases), OS/390 (all releases), MVS/ESA V5R2.2

z/OS File System (zFS) (official name: z/OS® Distributed File Service zSeries® File System) is a POSIX-style hierarchical file system for IBM's z/OS operating system for z System mainframes, a successor to that operating system's HFS.

zFS technology was first released in 1995 as the Local File System, a lower layer of the DCE Distributed File System. It was available on MVS/ESA V5R2.2 and all OS/390 releases. DFS/LFS was provided as a part of the DCE feature, not part of the base operating system.

As a separate feature (outside the DCE feature), zFS was initially released for z/OS as PTFs (patches) for z/OS 1.2, with backports available for z/OS 1.1 and OS/390 2.10. Beginning with z/OS 1.3, zFS is included as a standard feature and is being actively developed.
