= Program temporary fix =

In IBM terminology, a program temporary fix or product temporary fix (PTF) is a software fix, or a group of fixes, distributed in a form ready to install.

A PTF normally follows an Authorized Program Analysis Report (APAR). When an APAR fix is issued, the PTF is generally a tested APAR fix, or a set of APAR fixes. However, if an APAR is resolved as "Fixed If Next" or "Permanent Restriction", there may be no PTF for the current release, only a correction in a later release.

PTFs are used across multiple IBM platforms and are installed using platform-specific service tools. On IBM i, PTFs can be applied either temporarily or permanently, with temporarily applied fixes remaining reversible until they are made permanent. IBM i also distributes fixes in aggregated forms such as cumulative PTF packages and PTF groups. On z/OS, PTFs are commonly installed and tracked using System Modification Program/Extended (SMP/E). On z/VM, VMSES/E provides an installation and service toolset used for servicing software levels, including corrective service delivered as PTFs.

== History and development ==
IBM developed formal service workflows and tools to manage the distribution and installation of software fixes on its operating systems. Initially, installations had to install service through a semi-manual process.

Over time, IBM introduced service aids such as IMAPTFLE and utilities such as IEBEDIT to simplify the installation of batches of PTFs. For OS/360 and successors, this culminated in the System Modification Program (SMP) and System Modification Program/Extended (SMP/E).

For VM, IBM developed Virtual Machine Serviceability Enhancements Staged (VM/SP SES) and VMSES/E. For DOS/360 and successors, IBM used the Maintain System History Program (MSHP).

== PTF installation ==
On IBM i, PTF installation commonly involves loading a PTF into the system and then applying it to the affected product. IBM documentation describes the Load Program Temporary Fix (LODPTF) command as loading PTFs from media or save files into the product PTF library, and the Apply Program Temporary Fix (APYPTF) command as applying the fix to replace the affected objects in the product. The same documentation notes that PTFs can be applied temporarily or permanently, with temporarily applied fixes remaining reversible until they are made permanent.

In z/OS, PTFs are processed using SMP/E in several stages. Each PTF may include HOLDDATA, in which case it is known as an exception SYSMOD. In rare cases an installation may install a single PTF, but normally it installs available service except PTFs excluded by, for example, aging policies or HOLDDATA.

A typical z/OS service cycle may involve:

1. Downloading the most recent HOLDDATA.
2. Receiving the service and HOLDDATA into the Consolidated Software Inventory (CSI).
3. Running APPLY CHECK against the service and HOLDDATA to identify exception SYSMODs, verify prerequisites and list potential problems.
4. Reviewing exception SYSMODs, such as ACTION, DOC and hold items.
5. Ordering and receiving any missing prerequisites.
6. Reworking and reapplying any local exits or modifications affected by the service.
7. Applying the service to a test or non-production system, where available.
8. Monitoring the system before applying the service to production.
9. Accepting the service permanently if no problems are found.

If the system is adversely affected by the service, a system administrator may sometimes selectively RESTORE the PTF and seek further support from IBM. If no problems are found after the service is applied, it can be permanently installed, or ACCEPTed, into the system.

== PTF usage ==
PTFs were formerly distributed in groups on a Program Update Tape (PUT) or as a Recommended Service Upgrade (RSU), often on a monthly basis. They can now be downloaded directly through IBM support systems. In some cases, IBM releases a cumulative PTF package, a larger collection of fixes intended to be installed together.

One reason for the continued use of physical or image-based media has been the size of some service packages. For example, the default size of the /home file system on VIOS (Virtual I/O Server) for IBM System p has been cited as 10 GB. If cumulative PTF images exceed available space, they may need to be handled through alternative storage or installation methods.

PTFs are often issued in response to APARs submitted by customers or identified by IBM. They are a common step in correcting software errors before the correction is incorporated into a later product release.

== Terminology and variants ==
IBM documentation uses both the expanded forms program temporary fix and product temporary fix, while retaining the acronym PTF. IBM i documentation explicitly expands PTF as Program Temporary Fix in command references such as LODPTF and APYPTF. IBM z/VM service materials also refer to corrective service delivered as a Product Temporary Fix (PTF).

== Comparison to APAR ==
An Authorized Program Analysis Report (APAR) is a formal report used when IBM determines that a problem may be caused by a defect in an IBM program. IBM support may file an APAR after determining that the issue is not caused by third-party hardware, non-IBM software or user-specified configuration errors.

APARs may include information on known workarounds, whether a formal fix is planned for a future release and whether a PTF is planned. An APAR fix is typically intended to address a reported problem quickly, while a PTF is a tested correction that may close the APAR.

== Summary ==
There are at least two levels of fix:

- An APAR may result in an APAR fix.
- A PTF may provide a tested correction associated with one or more APARs.

The focus of an APAR fix is to address the problem as quickly as possible, whereas a PTF is a tested fix that may close the APAR.

== Humor ==
Customers sometimes explain the acronym in a tongue-in-cheek manner as permanent temporary fix or probably this fixes, referring to the option of making a PTF a permanent part of the operating system if the patch resolves the problem.

== See also ==
- Microsoft Update Catalog
- Patch (computing)
- Patch Tuesday
- SMP/E
- Software Updater
- Windows Server Update Services
- Windows Update
