= Hierarchical File System (IBM MVS) =

POSIX-style hierarchical file system

HFS
- Developer(s): IBM
- Full name: z/OS Hierarchical File System
- Introduced: 1993 with DFSMS/MVS Version 1.2 for MVS/ESA

Other
- Supported operating systems: included in z/OS (until 2.5), all releases of OS/390, and MVS/ESA V5R1 and higher (optional for V4R3)

IBM's Hierarchical File System (HFS) is a POSIX-style hierarchical file system for the MVS/ESA/SP through z/OS operating systems.

IBM introduced HFS on February 9, 1993 in MVS/ESA System Product Version 4 Release 3 OpenEdition with DFSMS/MVS Version 1 Release 2 for 3090 mainframes. On April 6, 1994, IBM introduced MVS/ESA System Product (MVS/ESA SP) Version 5 Release 1, which included MVS OpenEdition (MVS-OE) with HFS as a standard component. IBM continued providing HFS through z/OS 2.4 for z System mainframes.

IBM functionally stabilized HFS starting with z/OS 1.7, in 2005. The z/OS File System (zFS) was released as the higher performance successor to HFS in 1995, and IBM recommended migration from HFS to zFS. Following the release of zFS, z/OS releases included a tool, BPXWH2Z, to convert HFS to zFS.

IBM dropped the use of HFS in z/OS 2.5, in 2021.
