= HiperSocket =

Software for communication within servers

HiperSockets is an IBM technology for high-speed communications between partitions on a server with a hypervisor. The term is most commonly associated with System z9 and later IBM Z mainframes which can provide in-memory TCP/IP connections between and among LPARs running several different operating systems, including z/OS, z/VM, and Linux on IBM Z.

Although applications perceive no functional differences, HiperSockets require less processing overhead on either side of the connections, improving performance. Since they are memory-based, they operate at memory speeds, reducing network latency and improving end-user performance, especially for complex applications which would otherwise require multiple network hops to fulfill requests. HiperSockets also provide security benefits, especially on the memory key-protected mainframe, even without encryption, because there is no opportunity to intercept a network connection. Moreover, HiperSockets improve reliability and availability because there are no network hubs, routers, adapters, or wires to break.

The main disadvantage to HiperSockets is that they can only exist within a single physical system, so they are not applicable between and among physical systems. Server consolidation can help more applications use HiperSockets.

== See also ==
- zIIP
