= IBM XCF =

Component of the z/OS operating system

In IBM mainframes, a Cross-system Coupling Facility, or XCF, is a component of z/OS that manages communications between applications in a sysplex. Applications may be on the same system or different systems.

Systems communicate using messages transported by one of two mechanisms:

- Dedicated channel-to-channel links (CTC links).
- Structures in a Coupling Facility, only available in Parallel Sysplex, not in base sysplex.

In a parallel sysplex decisions about which of these two transport mechanisms to use for routing a specific message are made dynamically.

Within a single z/OS system messages are transported using cross-memory services, rather than being routed through either of the physical transport mechanisms.

Applications join specific groups as individual members. On joining a group a member can send or receive messages. Individual messages are assigned to specific transport classes, based on the message's size. Each transport class owns input and output buffers. Routing decisions are made at the transport class level.
