= Authorized Program Analysis Report =

An APAR (Authorized Program Analysis Report) (pronounced A-PAR, rhymes with far) is an IBM designation of a document intended to identify situations that could result in potential problems. It also serves as a request for the correction of a defect in current releases of IBM-supplied programs.

== The Process ==
"Occasionally" IBM software has a bug.

Once it has been ascertained that the situation has not been caused by problems in third-party hardware or software or the user's configuration errors, IBM support staff, if they suspect that a defect in a current release of an IBM program is the cause, will file a formal report confirming the existence of an issue. In addition to confirming the existence of an issue, APARs include information on known workarounds, information on whether a formal fix is scheduled to be included in future releases, and whether or not a Program Temporary Fix (PTF) is planned.

=== Documenting the problem ===
IBM has a program to facilitate documenting the problem.

=== Solution levels ===
There are at least 2 levels of fix:

- The APAR may result in "an APAR fix."
- a permanent correction called a PTF. whereas the PTF "is a tested APAR... The PTF 'closes' the APAR." Prior to that, an APAR is "a problem with an IBM program that is formally tracked until a solution is provided.”

A PTF is a permanent correction with respect to the VRM (Version, Release, Modification) level of the product to which it is applicable, and is a temporary fix in the sense that the problem correction will temporarily be available as a permanent fix, and later will be incorporated into the product base code, and will thereby no longer be a fix, although the associated PTF and/or APAR numbers will, as a rule, be included in the source documentation associated with the ensuing base code update.

'

The acronym referred to: System Improvement / Difficulty Report.

== System Improvement Request ==
SIR (System Improvement Request) is a terminology that Digital Equipment Corporation used, much as Xerox used SIDR.

== See also ==
- List of IBM products
