= SDSF =

Component of the z/OS operating system

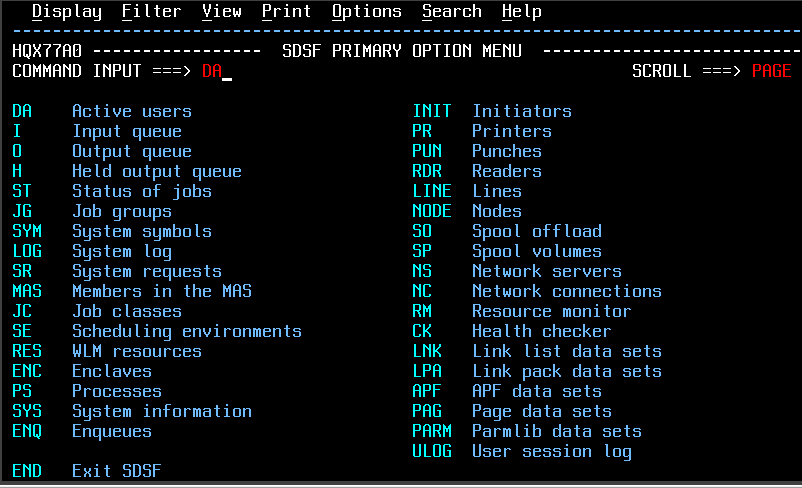
The SDSF Primary option menu

The System Display and Search Facility (SDSF) is a component of IBM's mainframe operating system, z/OS, which allows users and administrators to view and control various aspects of the mainframe's operation and system resources using an interactive user interface. Information displayed in SDSF includes batch job output, Unix processes, scheduling environments, and the status of external devices such as printers and network lines, batch and system log files and dumps.

== History ==
Originally written as a field developed program in 1979 by Carl Porter (IBM Sales Engineer), the "SDSF" acronym stood for "SYSLOG Display and Search Facility". The first version of the product allowed the user to browse and search the MVS system log.

The next iteration of the product included tabular displays that showed the various JES2 queues on the SPOOL (input, output, held and active jobs) and the acronym was altered to be "SPOOL Display and Search Facility" circa 1987. These displays are collectively known as the "queue panels" and they enable most mainframe users to view and manage their own jobs and output. SDSF became an official IBM program product in the 1980s and later on became an optional component of the operating system as its use was so widespread and important to the administration and operation of MVS.

The original design included retrieving information from JES2 and MVS control blocks and was sensitive to any changes to those structures which would require parts to be rebuilt. The product was supplied with source code throughout the 1980s and 1990s. JES2 eventually provided a subsystem interface (SSI) so that SDSF could remove its reliance on control block processing. Over time, a lot of the SDSF code was rewritten from assembler in PLX and this greatly reduced the amount of supplied source code.

With z/OS Release 1.9, SDSF supports a REXX interface, allowing batch programs to use SDSF facilities. This support includes stem variables containing SDSF-originated information.

Prior to z/OS Release 1.10, SDSF was only supported for use with JES2 and not JES3, although ISV products from Phoenix Software International and Tone Software were available with similar functionality for JES3. At and beyond z/OS Release 1.10, SDSF fully supports JES3, including some new commands (JDS and ODS) to display the data/sets and job output for JES3 jobs.

With the release of z/OS V1R13, SDSF came packed with some interesting features like cursor-sensitive sort or point-and-shoot sort and extensive support for open logs from Rexx and Java-programmed environments.

As SDSF was enhanced to display more operating system information, its acroynum was changed to mean "SYSTEM Display and Search Facility".

In 2015, IBM divested the development and support of SDSF to Rocket Software with a focus on re-invigoration of product functionality. A new server address space "SDSFAUX" was introduced as a SPE for z/OS 2.1 and 2.2 which was a strategic archiectural enhancement for future improvements to the product.

The main SDSF server was rewritten in z/OS 2.3 and the display manager code was rewritten in z/OS 2.4.

In z/OS 2.5, the legacy internal security mechanisms were deprecated in favour of using SAF resources protected by External Security Managers like RACF, ACF/2 and TopSecret.

In z/OS 3.2, SDSF added a python interface (pySDSF) to complement the existing REXX and Java interfaces.

== See also ==
- z/OS operating system, and its originator MVS
