= Resource Access Control Facility =

Standard security product included in the z/OS operating system

Resource Access Control Facility (RACF) is an IBM software security product that provides access control and auditing functions for the z/OS and z/VM operating systems. RACF was introduced in 1976. Originally called RACF it was renamed to z/OS Security Server (RACF), although many mainframe professionals still refer to it as RACF.

Its main features are:

- Identification and verification of a user via user id and password check (authentication)
- Identification, classification and protection of system resources
- Maintenance of access rights to the protected resources (access control)
- Controlling the means of access to protected resources
- Logging of accesses to a protected system and protected resources (auditing)

RACF establishes security policies rather than just permission records. It can set permissions for file patterns—that is, set the permissions even for files that do not yet exist. Those permissions are then used for the file (or other object) created at a later time.

== Community ==
There is a long established technical support community for RACF based around a LISTSERV operated out of the University of Georgia. The list is called RACF-L which is described as RACF Discussion List. The email address of the listserv is RACF-L@LISTSERV.UGA.EDU and can also be viewed via a webportal at https://listserv.uga.edu/scripts/wa-UGA.exe .

== Books ==
The first text book published (first printing December 2007) aimed at giving security professionals an introduction to the concepts and conventions of how RACF is designed and administered was Mainframe Basics for Security Professionals: Getting Started with RACF by Ori Pomerantz, Barbara Vander Weele, Mark Nelson, and Tim Hahn.

== Evolution ==
RACF has continuously evolved to support such modern security features as digital certificates/public key infrastructure services, LDAP interfaces, and case sensitive IDs/passwords. The latter is a reluctant concession to promote interoperability with other systems, such as Unix and Linux. The underlying zSeries (now IBM Z) hardware works closely with RACF. For example, digital certificates are protected within tamper-proof cryptographic processors. Major mainframe subsystems, especially Db2, use RACF to provide multi-level security (MLS).

Its primary competitors have been ACF2 and TopSecret, both now produced by CA Technologies.
