= Logical partition =

Subset of computer's virtualised hardware resources

A logical partition (LPAR) is a subset of a computer's hardware resources, virtualized as a separate computer. In effect, a physical machine can be partitioned into multiple logical partitions, each hosting a separate instance of an operating system.

== History ==
IBM developed the concept of hypervisors (virtual machines in CP-40 and CP-67) and in 1972 provided it for the S/370 as Virtual Machine Facility/370. IBM introduced the Start Interpretive Execution (SIE) instruction (designed specifically for the execution of virtual machines) in 1983 as part of 370-XA architecture on the IBM 3081, as well as VM/XA versions of VM to exploit it.

Amdahl Corporation's Multiple Domain Facility (MDF) was introduced in 1982. IBM introduced its functionally similar PR/SM in 1988, implemented on its ESA/370 architecture released that year with the IBM 3090 processors. PR/SM (Processor Resource/System Manager) is a type-1 Hypervisor (a virtual machine monitor) that allows multiple logical partitions to share physical resources such as CPUs, memory, I/O channels and LAN interfaces; the LPARs can share I/O devices such as direct access storage devices (DASD). Initially, the operator could select either basic mode or logical partition mode. PR/SM is integrated with all IBM System z machines. Formally, LPAR designates the mode of operation or an individual logical partition, whereas PR/SM is the commercial designation of the feature.

MDF-based LPAR technology continued to be developed separately by Amdahl, and Hitachi Data Systems in part for their implementations of the new ESA/370 architecture, which featured the introduction of access registers that allowed use of multiple data spaces addressable by a single address space.

IBM subsequently continued its LPAR development with its 64-bit System z architecture. LPAR and PR/SM reconfigurations can be made without rebooting the computer, i.e., while some LPARs remain active. Reconfigurations can include changing channel path definitions and device definitions.

IBM introduced a related, simplified, optional feature called Dynamic Partition Manager (DPM) on its IBM z13 and first generation IBM LinuxONE machines. DPM provides Web-based user interfaces for many LPAR-related configuration and monitoring tasks.

z/VM supports the z/Architecture HiperSockets function for high-speed TCP/IP communication among virtual machines and logical partitions (LPARs) within the same IBM zSeries server. This function uses an adaptation of the Queued-Direct Input/Output (QDIO) high-speed I/O protocol.

IBM introduced LPARs to their PowerPC-based AS/400 (later called iSeries) and pSeries servers in 1999 and 2001, respectively, albeit with varying technical specifications. Those systems use PHYP (the POWER Hypervisor) to enable their LPAR functionalities since approximately 2000 in POWER4 systems. This support continues in IBM Power Systems.

Multiple operating systems are compatible with LPARs, including z/OS, z/VM, z/VSE, and z/TPF on mainframes, AIX and IBM i on IBM Power Systems, and Linux on both.

In storage systems, such as the IBM TotalStorage DS8000, LPARs allow for multiple virtual instances of a storage array to exist within a single physical array.

In early 2010 Fujitsu announced availability of its x86-64 PRIMEQUEST line of servers, which support LPARs. In late 2011, Hitachi announced availability of CB2000 and CB320 blade systems, which support LPAR on x86-64 hardware.

== Hardware partitioning ==
Logical partitioning divides hardware resources. Two LPARs may access memory from a common memory chip, provided that the ranges of addresses directly accessible to each do not overlap. It is possible for one partition to control memory managed by a second partition indirectly by communicating with a process on the partition with direct access, which acts as an intermediary. CPUs may be dedicated to a single LPAR or shared. While on Amdahl's MDF (Multiple Domain Facility) it was possible to configure an LPAR with both shared and dedicated CPUs, this is no longer possible with any mainframes currently in the market.

On IBM mainframes, LPARs are managed by the PR/SM facility or a related, optional, simplified facility called Dynamic Partition Manager (DPM). All 64-bit IBM mainframes, except for the first generation 64-bit models (z900 and z800), operate exclusively in LPAR mode, even when there is only one partition on a machine. Multiple LPARs running z/OS can form a Sysplex or Parallel Sysplex, whether on one machine or spread across multiple machines.

On IBM System p POWER hardware, LPARs are managed by PHYP (the POWER Hypervisor). PHYP acts as a virtual switch between the LPARs and also handles the virtual SCSI traffic between LPARs. Micro-Partitioning supports 10 times as many LPARs as processors with fractional allocations. It was introduced with the POWER5 processor. All IBM POWER5, POWER6, and successor systems may be partitioned. Note that a full system partition may be defined where all resources are consumed by a single partition. System P servers with PowerVM enabled allow LPARs with shared CPUs to delegate their unused cycles into the shared pool. Dedicated processors are not available for sharing. Unused cycles become available for other partitions and are governed by the parameters specified when the LPAR is defined. Changes to a running partition can be made dynamically up to the maximum value set, and down to the minimum value set in the active profile. The changing of resource allocations without restart of the logical partition is called dynamic logical partitioning. IBM PowerVM is the licensed/purchased feature that enables the virtualization features on p4, 5, 6, 7, and subsequent series servers.

Exploiting Intel vPro (i.e. Non-uniform memory access), there are also implementations of Logical Partitioning based on Intel Xeon e.g. by Hitachi Data Systems.

LPARs (with sufficient certification) safely allow combining multiple test, development, quality assurance, and production work on the same server, offering advantages such as lower costs, faster deployment, and more convenience. IBM mainframe LPARs are Common Criteria EAL 5+ certifiable, equivalent to physically unconnected servers, so they support the highest security requirements, including military use. Nearly all IBM mainframes run with multiple LPARs with the IBM System z9 and IBM System z10 supporting up to 60 LPARs and later models up to 85.

== See also ==
- Dynamic Logical Partitioning – Logical partition technology in IBM POWER servers
- Full virtualization – Methods for dividing computing resources
- HiperSocket – Software for communication within servers
- Logical Domains – Server partitioning hardware and software
- Platform virtualization – Virtualization of computers or operating systems
- Solaris Containers – OS-level virtualisation
- Workload Partitions – OS-level virtualisation
