= Z/OS =

64-bit operating system for IBM mainframes

z/OS
- Developer: IBM
- Written in: primarily PL/X, HLASM, and C/C++
- OS family: MVS; Unix
- Working state: Current
- Source model: Closed source with open source components
- Initial release: March 30, 2001; 25 years ago (V1R1, announced October, 2000)
- Latest release: Version 3.2 (V3R2) / September 30, 2025; 11 months ago
- Marketing target: Enterprise / Mainframes
- Available in: English and other languages
- Package manager: SMP/E
- Supported platforms: z/Architecture
- Kernel type: Monolithic (uniquely hardware-assisted)
- Userland: MVS, UNIX System Services
- Default user interface: ISPF, z/OS Management Facility
- License: Proprietary monthly license charge (MLC); pricing available based on actual use (VWLC, EWLC, AWLC, EAWLC, IWP); reduced pricing options (zELC, zNALC, "Solution Edition") for many applications
- Official website: ibm.com/products/zos

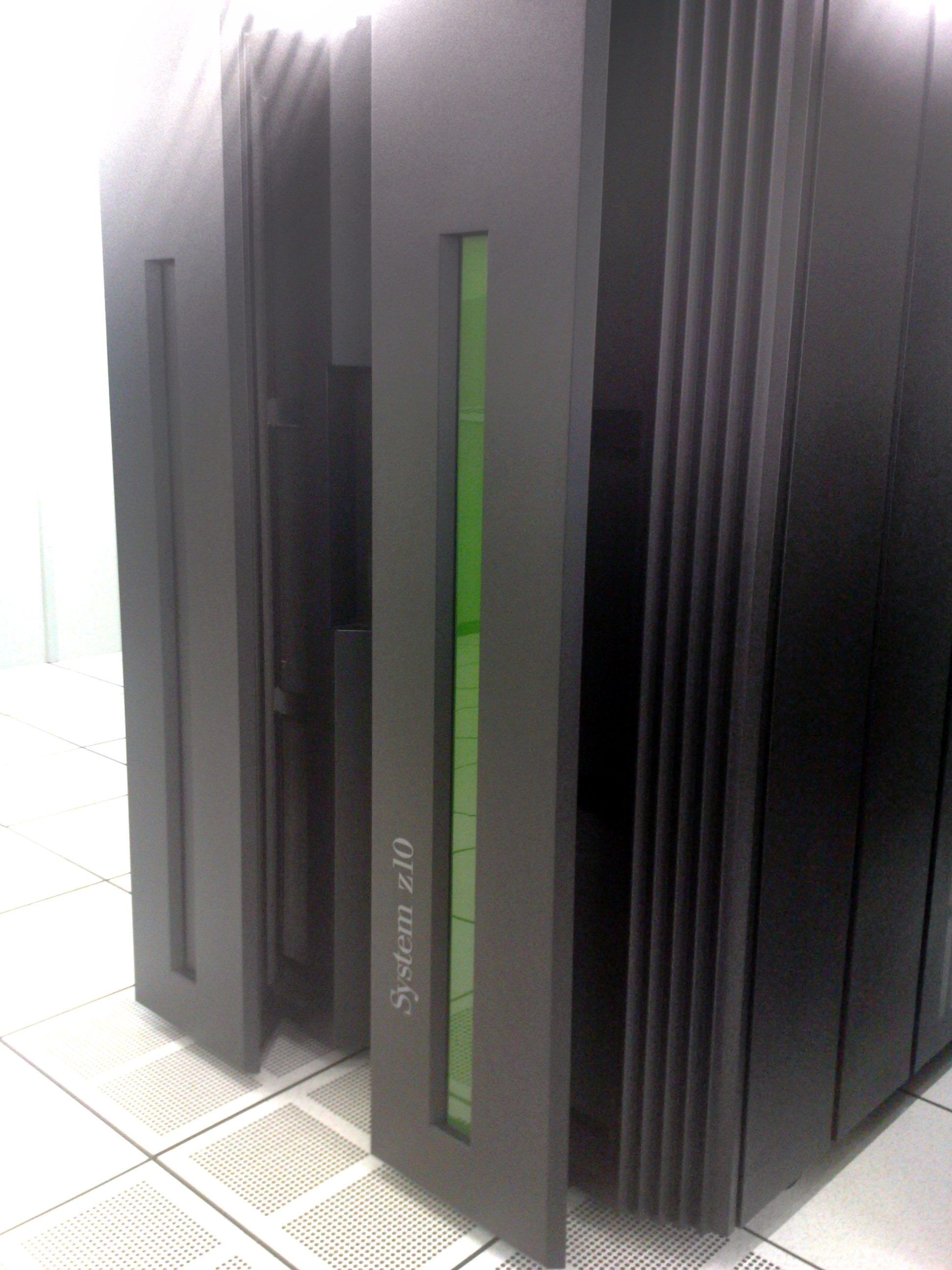
An IBM System Z10 mainframe computer on which z/OS can run

z/OS is a 64-bit operating system for IBM z/Architecture mainframes, introduced by IBM in October 2000. It derives from and is the successor to OS/390, which in turn was preceded by a string of MVS versions. (Note: Starting with the earliest: OS/VS2 Release 2 through Release 3.8; MVS/System Extensions (MVS/SE); MVS/System Product (MVS/SP) Version 1; MVS/System Product Version 2 (MVS/Extended Architecture, MVS/XA); MVS/System Product Version 3 (MVS/Enterprise Systems Architecture, MVS/ESA); MVS/ESA SP Version 4; MVS/ESA SP Version 5) Like OS/390, z/OS combines a number of formerly separate, related products, some of which are still optional. z/OS has the attributes of modern operating systems but also retains much of the older functionality that originated in the 1960s and is still in regular use—z/OS is designed for backward compatibility.

== Major characteristics ==
z/OS supports (Note: Some, e.g., TSO/E, are bundled with z/OS, others, e.g., CICS, are separately priced.) stable mainframe facilities such as CICS, COBOL, IMS, PL/I, IBM Db2, RACF, SNA, IBM MQ, record-oriented data access methods, REXX, CLIST, SMP/E, JCL, TSO/E, and ISPF, among others.

z/OS also ships with a 64-bit Java runtime, C/C++ compiler based on the LLVM open-source Clang infrastructure, and UNIX (Single UNIX Specification) APIs and applications through UNIX System Services – The Open Group certifies z/OS as a compliant UNIX operating system – with UNIX/Linux-style HFS (Note: Not to be confused with the Macintosh HFS.) (Note: IBM has dropped HFS starting with z/OS Version 2 Release 5.) and zFS (Note: Not to be confused with ZFS.) file systems. These compatibilities make z/OS capable of running a range of commercial and open-source software. z/OS can communicate directly via TCP/IP, including IPv6, and includes standard HTTP servers (one from Lotus, the other Apache-derived) along with other common services such as SSH, FTP, NFS, and CIFS/SMB. z/OS is designed for high quality of service (QoS), even within a single operating system instance, and has built-in Parallel Sysplex clustering capability.

z/OS has a Workload Manager (WLM) and dispatcher which automatically manages numerous concurrently hosted units of work running in separate key-protected address spaces according to dynamically adjustable goals. This capability inherently supports multi-tenancy within a single operating system image. However, modern IBM mainframes also offer two additional levels of virtualization: LPARs and (optionally) z/VM.

From its inception z/OS has had tri-modal addressing (24-bit, 31-bit, and 64-bit). Up through Version 1.5, z/OS itself could start in either 31-bit ESA/390 or 64-bit z/Architecture mode, so it could function on older hardware, albeit without the ability to run 64-bit applications on those machines. (Only the newer z/Architecture hardware manufactured starting in the year 2000 can run 64-bit code.) IBM support for z/OS 1.5 ended on March 31, 2007, and since then, z/OS is supported only on z/Architecture mainframes and runs exclusively in 64-bit mode. Application programmers can still use any addressing mode: all applications, regardless of their addressing mode(s), can coexist without modification, and IBM maintains a commitment to tri-modal backward compatibility. However, increasing numbers of middleware products and applications, such as DB2 Version 8 and above, now require and exploit 64-bit addressing.

IBM markets z/OS as its flagship operating system, suited for continuous, high-volume operation with high security and stability.

z/OS is available under standard license pricing and via IBM Z New Application License Charges (zNALC) and "IBM Z Solution Edition", two lower-priced offerings aimed at supporting newer applications ("new workloads"). U.S. standard commercial z/OS pricing starts at about US$125 per month, including support, for the smallest zNALC installation running the base z/OS product plus a typical set of optional z/OS features.

z/OS introduced Variable Workload License Charges (VWLC) and Entry Workload License Charges (EWLC) which are sub-capacity billing options. VWLC and EWLC customers only pay for peak monthly z/OS usage, not for full machine capacity as with the previous OS/390 operating system. VWLC and EWLC are also available for most IBM software products running on z/OS, and their peaks are separately calculated but can never exceed the z/OS peak. To be eligible for sub-capacity licensing, a z/OS customer must be running in 64-bit mode (which requires z/Architecture hardware), must have eliminated OS/390 from the system, and must e-mail IBM monthly sub-capacity reports. Sub-capacity billing substantially reduces software charges for most IBM mainframe customers. Advanced Workload License Charges (AWLC) is the successor to VWLC on mainframe models starting with the zEnterprise 196, and EAWLC is an option on zEnterprise 114 models. AWLC and EAWLC offer further sub-capacity discounts.

== Other features ==
=== 64-bit memory support ===
z/OS supports 64-bit addresses for both virtual and real addresses. Within each address space, z/OS initially permitted the placement of only data, not code, above the 2 GiB bar. z/OS enforced this distinction primarily for compatibility reasons. There are no architectural impediments to allowing more than 2 GiB of application code per address space; Linux on IBM Z supports it, for example. IBM has started to allow Java code running on z/OS to execute above the 2 GiB bar, for performance reasons.

Starting with z/OS Version 2 Release 3, code may be placed and executed above the 2 GiB bar. However, very few z/OS services may be invoked from above the bar.

Memory above the bar is obtained as "Large Memory Objects" in multiples of 1 MiB (with the expectation that applications and middleware will manage memory allocation within these large pieces). There are three types of large memory objects:

- Unshared – where only the creating address space can access the memory.
- Shared – where the creating address space can give access to specific other address spaces.
- Common – where all address spaces can access the memory. (This type was introduced in z/OS Version 1 Release 10)

=== z/OS Encryption Readiness Technology (zERT) ===
z/OS Encryption Readiness Technology (zERT) monitors, records, and reports details of z/OS cryptographic network protection. It is a feature of z/OS V2R3 (and later releases) Communications Server component.

==== zERT discovery ====
With zERT, the TCP/IP stack acts as a focal point in collecting and reporting the cryptographic security attributes of IPv4 and IPv6 application traffic that is protected using the TLS/SSL, SSH and IPSec cryptographic network security protocols. The collected connection level data is written to SMF in new SMF 119 subtype 11 records for analysis.

==== zERT aggregation ====
In certain environments, the volume of SMF 119 subtype 11 records can be large. The zERT aggregation function provides an alternative SMF view of the collected security session data. This alternate view is written in the form of new SMF 119 subtype 12 records that summarize the use of security sessions by many application connections over time and which are written at the end of each SMF interval. This alternate view condenses the volume of SMF record data while still providing all the critical security information.

==== IBM zERT Network Analyzer ====
z/OS Management Facility (z/OSMF) is enhanced to provide a plug-in named IBM zERT Network Analyzer. IBM zERT Network Analyzer is a web-based graphical user interface that z/OS network security administrators can use to analyze and report on data reported in zERT Summary records. With the zERT Network Analyzer, a z/OS network security administrator (typically a systems programmer with responsibility over z/OS Communications Server) can import SMF zERT summary records into a Db2 for z/OS database and then build and run custom queries against that data.

=== Operational data collection and analysis ===
Operational data is data that z/OS system produces when it runs. This data indicates the health of the system and can be used to identify sources of performance and availability issues in the system. IBM Z Operational Log and Data Analytics and IBM Z Anomaly Analytics with Watson collect IT operational data from z/OS systems, analyze and provide insights about the operational data.

IBM Z Operational Log and Data Analytics collects IT operational data from z/OS systems, transforms it to a consumable format, and streams it to third-party enterprise analytics platforms like the Elastic Stack and Splunk, or to the included operational data analysis platform. The included insights can help to visualize and search operational data to help identify the cause of operational issues.

IBM Z Anomaly Analytics with Watson collects IT operational data from z/OS systems, uses historical IBM Z metric and log data to build a model of normal operational behavior, then analyzes real-time operational data through comparison with the model of normal operations to detect anomalous behavior, and notifies IT operations of the anomalous behavior to identify incidents that might lead to business disruption.

==== Operational data types ====
IBM Z Operational Log and Data Analytics collects and analyzes both structured and unstructured data, including the following types of operational data:

- System Management Facilities (SMF) data
- Log data from the following sources:
  - Job log, output that is written by the Job entry subsystem on behalf of a running job
  - logrec, a log of equipment failures, environmental issues and statistics
  - z/OS UNIX log file, including the UNIX System Services system log (syslogd)
  - Entry-sequenced Virtual Storage Access Method (VSAM) cluster
  - z/OS system log (SYSLOG)
  - IBM Tivoli NetView for z/OS messages
  - IBM WebSphere Application Server for z/OS High Performance Extensible Logging (HPEL) log
  - z/OS Resource Measurement Facility (RMF) Monitor III reports
- User application data, the operational data from users' own applications

IBM Z Anomaly Analytics with Watson collects data from multiple IBM Z systems and subsystems, including IBM Db2 for z/OS, IBM CICS Transaction Server for z/OS and IBM MQ for z/OS. The following types of operational data are collected:

- System Management Facilities (SMF) data
- z/OS system log (SYSLOG)

== z/OS Releases ==
z/OS releases
Order No.	Announced	Shipped	Support dropped	Rel #	Version
5694-A01	2000-10-03; 200-352	2001-03-30	2004-03-31	1	1
5694-A01	2001-09-11; 201-248	2001-10-26	2004-10-31	2	1
5694-A01	2002-02-19; 202-031	2002-03-29	2005-03-31	3	1
5694-A01	2002-08-13; 202-190	2002-09-27	2007-03-31	4	1
5694-A01	2004-02-10; 204-017	2004-03-26	2007-03-31	5	1
5694-A01	2004-08-10; 204-180	2004-09-24	2007-09-30	6	1
5694-A01	2005-07-27; 205-167	2005-09-30	2008-09-30	7	1
5694-A01	2006-08-08; 206-190	2006-09-29	2009-09-30	8	1
5694-A01	2007-08-08; 207-175	2007-09-28	2010-09-30	9	1
5694-A01	2008-08-05; 208-186	2008-09-26	2011-09	10	1
5694-A01	2009-08-18; 209-242	2009-09-25	2013-09	11	1
5694-A01	2010-07-22; 210-235	2010-09-24	2015-09	12	1
5694-A01	2011-07-12; 211-252	2011-09-30	2017-09	13	1
5650-ZOS	2013-07-23; 213-292	2013-09-30	2019-09	1	2
5650-ZOS	2015-07-28; 215-267	2015-09-30	2021-09	2	2
5650-ZOS	2017-07-17; 217-246	2017-09-27	2022-09-30	3	2
5650-ZOS	2019-02-26; 219-013	2019-09-30	2024-09-30	4	2
5650-ZOS	2021-06-27; 221-260	2021-09-30	2026-09-30	5	2
5655-ZOS	2023-02-28; 223-012	2023-09-29	TBA	1	3
5655-ZOS	2025-07-22; AD25-0005	2025-09-30	TBA	2	
Legend: Supported Latest version

== See also ==
- Fujitsu MSP
- HiperDispatch
- Hitachi VOS3
- Intelligent Resource Director
- Linux on IBM Z
- Parallel Sysplex
- Resource Measurement Facility
- SDSF
- SMF
- SMP/E
- z/TPF
- WebSphere Application Server
- Workload Manager
- zAAP, a specialty processor dedicated to particular z/OS workloads
- zIIP, another specialty processor dedicated to particular z/OS workloads
- z/VSE for another mainframe operating system
