= Microprocessor chronology =

Timeline of microprocessors

Progress of miniaturisation, and comparison of sizes of semiconductor manufacturing process nodes with some microscopic objects and visible light wavelengths

== 1970s ==
The first chips that could be considered microprocessors were designed and manufactured in the late 1960s and early 1970s, including the MP944 used in the Grumman F-14 CADC. Intel's 4004 of 1971 is widely regarded as the first commercial microprocessor.

Designers predominantly used MOSFET transistors with pMOS logic in the early 1970s, switching to nMOS logic after the mid-1970s. Depletion-mode nMOS had the advantage that it could run on a single voltage, typically +5V, which simplified the power supply requirements and allowed it to be easily interfaced with the wide variety of +5V transistor-transistor logic (TTL) devices. nMOS had the disadvantage that it was more susceptible to electronic noise generated by slight impurities in the underlying silicon material, and it was not until the mid-1970s that these, sodium in particular, were successfully removed to the required levels. At that time, around 1975, nMOS quickly took over the market.

This corresponded with the introduction of new semiconductor masking systems, notably the Micralign system from Perkin-Elmer. Micralign projected an image of the mask onto the silicon wafer, never touching it directly, which eliminated the previous problems when the mask would be lifted off the surface and take away some of the photoresist along with it, ruining the chips on that portion of the wafer. By reducing the number of flawed chips, from about 70% to 10%, the cost of complex designs like early microprocessors fell by the same amount. Systems based on contact aligners cost on the order of $300 in single-unit quantities, the MOS 6502, designed specifically to take advantage of these improvements, cost only $25.

This period also saw considerable experimentation with various word lengths. Early on, 4-bit processors were common, like the Intel 4004, simply because making a wider word length could not be accomplished cost-effectively in the room available on the small wafers of the era, especially when the majority would be defective. As yields improved, wafer sizes grew, and feature size continued to be reduced, more complex 8-bit designs emerged like the Intel 8080 and 6502. 16-bit processors emerged early but were expensive; by the decade's end, low-cost 16-bit designs like the Zilog Z8000 were becoming common. Some unusual word lengths were also produced, including 12-bit and 20-bit, often matching a design that had previously been implemented in a multi-chip format in a minicomputer. These had largely disappeared by the end of the decade as minicomputers moved to 32-bit formats.

Date	Name	Developer	Max clock (first version)	Word size (bits)	Process	Chips	Transistors	MOSFET	Ref
1970	AL1	Four-Phase Systems	1 MHz	8-bit slice (Note: The AL1 chip is an 8-bit slice arithmetic logic unit with registers. Four-Phase did not sell the AL1 individually but as part of a system combining three of these 8-bit AL1 chips to yield a multi-chip CPU with a 24-bit word size.)	10 μm	1 (Note: A 1995 court demo combined one AL1 with ROM, RAM, and I/0 to argue that the AL1 alone be considered a microprocessor. But because it requires an external microcode controller, another view disagrees.)	4,000	MOS	
1970	TMS1802NC (Note: TMS1802NC is the original designation of the TMS0102, which is considered a microcontroller because it incorporates all program ROM internally. It can't execute external code and programming is done during manufacture. The term microprocessor may instead be reserved for devices that can execute external code.)	Texas Instruments	400 kHz	4	10 μm	1	~5,000	pMOS	
1971	4004	Intel	740 kHz	4	10 μm	1	2,250	pMOS	
1972	PPS-25	Fairchild	400 kHz	4		2		pMOS	(Note: According to Ogdin 1975, the Fairchild PPS-25 was first delivered in 2Q 1971 and the Intel 4004 in 4Q 1971.)
1972	μPD700	NEC		4		1			
1972	8008	Intel	500 kHz	8	10 μm	1	3,500	pMOS	
1972	PPS-4	Rockwell	200 kHz	4		1		pMOS	
1973	IMP-16	National	715 kHz	16 (Note: The 16-bit registers and ALU were implemented by combining four identical 4-bit slice chips. The National Semiconductor PACE reimplemented its architecture as the first single-chip 16-bit microprocessor.)		5		pMOS	
1973	μCOM-4	NEC	2 MHz	4	7.5 μm	1	2,500	NMOS	
1973	TLCS-12	Toshiba	1 MHz	12	6 μm	1	2,800 silicon gates	pMOS	
1973	Mini-D	Burroughs	1 MHz	8		1		pMOS	
1974	IMP-8	National	715 kHz	8		3		pMOS	
1974	8080	Intel	2 MHz	8	6 μm	1	6,000	NMOS	
1974	μCOM-8	NEC	2 MHz	8		1		NMOS	
1974	5065	Mostek	1.4 MHz	8		1		pMOS	
1974	μCOM-16	NEC	2 MHz	16		2		NMOS	
1974	IMP-4	National	500 kHz	4		3		pMOS	
1974	4040	Intel	740 kHz	4	10 μm	1	3,000	pMOS	
1974	6800	Motorola	1 MHz	8	-	1	4,100	NMOS	
1974	TMS 1000	Texas Instruments	400 kHz	4	8 μm	1	8,000	pMOS, nMOS, cMOS	
1974	IPC-16A PACE	National	1.33 MHz	16		1		pMOS	
1974	ISP-8A/500 (SC/MP)	National	1 MHz	8		1		pMOS	
1975	6100	Intersil	4 MHz	12	-	1	4,000	CMOS	
1975	TLCS-12A	Toshiba	1.2 MHz	12	-	1		pMOS	
1975	2650	Signetics	1.2 MHz	8		1		NMOS	
1975	PPS-8	Rockwell	256 kHz	8		1		pMOS	
1975	F-8	Fairchild	2 MHz	8		1		NMOS	
1975	CDP 1801	RCA	2 MHz	8	5 μm	2	5,000	CMOS	
1975	6502	MOS Technology	1 MHz	8	-	1	3,510	NMOS (dynamic)	
1975	PFL-16A (MN 1610)	Panafacom	2 MHz	16	-	1		NMOS	
1975	BPC	Hewlett Packard	10 MHz	16	-	1	6,000 (+ ROM)	NMOS	
1975	MCP-1600	Western Digital	3.3 MHz	16 (Note: Internally is an 8-bit processor, but is micro-programmed to emulate a 16-bit CPU.)	-	3 (Note: Later microprocessors were based on this chipset. The LSI-11 in 1975 used 4 chips, the WD16 in 1976 used 5 chips, and the Pascal MicroEngine in 1979 used 5 chips.)		NMOS	
1975	CP1600	General Instrument	3.3 MHz	16		1		NMOS	
1976	CDP 1802	RCA	6.4 MHz	8		1		CMOS	
1976	Z80	Zilog	2.5 MHz	8	4 μm	1	8,500	NMOS	
1976	TMS9900	Texas Instruments	3.3 MHz	16	-	1	8,000	nMOS	
1976	8x300	Signetics	8 MHz	8		1		Bipolar	
1977	Bellmac-8 (WE212)	Bell Labs	2.0 MHz	8	5 μm	1	7,000	CMOS	
1977	8085	Intel	3.0 MHz	8	3 μm	1	6,500	nMOS	
1977	MC14500B	Motorola	1.0 MHz	1		1		CMOS	
1978	6809	Motorola	1 MHz	8	5 μm	1	9,000	NMOS	
1978	8086	Intel	5 MHz	16	3 μm	1	29,000	nMOS	
1978	6801	Motorola	-	8	5 μm	1	35,000	nMOS	
1979	Z8000	Zilog	-	16	-	1	17,500	nMOS	
1979	8088	Intel	5 MHz	8/16 (Note: The Intel 8088 had an 8-bit external data bus, but internally used a 16-bit architecture.)	3 μm	1	29,000	NMOS (HMOS)	
1979	68000	Motorola	8 MHz	16/32 (Note: The Motorola 68000 had a 16-bit external data bus, but internally used 32-bit registers.)	3.5 μm	1	68,000	NMOS (HMOS)	

== 1980s ==
As Moore's Law continued to drive the industry towards more complex chip designs, the expected widespread move from 8-bit designs of the 1970s to 16-bit designs almost didn't occur; instead, new 32-bit designs like the Motorola 68000 and National Semiconductor NS32000 emerged that offered far more performance. The only widespread use of 16-bit systems was in the IBM PC, which had selected the Intel 8088 in 1979 before the new designs had matured.

Another change was the move to CMOS gates as the primary method of building complex CPUs. CMOS had been available since the early 1970s; RCA introduced the COSMAC processor using CMOS in 1975. Whereas earlier systems used a single transistor as the basis for each "gate", CMOS used a two-sided design, essentially making it twice as expensive to build. Its advantage was that its logic was not based on the voltage of a transistor compared to the silicon substrate, but the difference in voltages between the two sides, which was detectable at much lower power levels. As processor complexity continued to grow, power dissipation had become a significant concern and chips were prone to overheating; CMOS greatly reduced this problem and quickly took over the market. This was aided by the uptake of CMOS by Japanese firms while US firms remained on nMOS, giving the Japanese industry a major advance during the 1980s.

Semiconductor fabrication techniques continued to improve throughout. The Micralign, which had "created the modern IC industry", was obsolete by the early 1980s. They were replaced by the new steppers, which used high magnifications and extremely powerful light sources to allow a large mask to be copied onto the wafer at ever-smaller sizes. This technology allowed the industry to break below the former 1 micron limit.

Key home computers in the early part of the decade predominantly use processors developed in the 1970s. Versions of the 6502, first released in 1975, powered the Commodore 64, Apple II, BBC Micro, and Atari 8-bit computers. The 8-bit Zilog Z80 (1976) is at the core of the ZX Spectrum, MSX systems and many others. The 8086-based IBM PC, launched in 1981, started the move to 16-bit, but was soon passed by the 68000-based 16/32-bit Macintosh, then the Atari ST and Amiga. IBM PC compatibles moved to 32-bit with the introduction of the Intel 80386 in late 1985, although 386-based systems were considerably expensive at the time.

In addition to ever-growing word lengths, microprocessors began to add additional functional units that had previously been optional external parts. By the middle of the decade, memory management units (MMUs) were becoming commonplace, first appearing on designs like the Intel 80286 and Motorola 68030. By the end of the decade, floating point units (FPUs) were being added, first appearing on 1989s Intel 486 and followed the next year by the Motorola 68040.

Another change that began during the 1980s involved overall design philosophy with the emergence of the reduced instruction set computer, or RISC. Although the concept was first developed by IBM in the 1970s, the company did not introduce powerful systems based on it, largely for fear of cannibalizing their sales of larger mainframe systems. Market introduction was driven by smaller companies like MIPS Technologies, SPARC and ARM. These companies did not have access to high-end fabrication like Intel and Motorola, but were able to introduce chips that were highly competitive with those companies with a fraction of the complexity. By the end of the decade, every major vendor was introducing a RISC design of their own, like the IBM POWER, Intel i860 and Motorola 88000.

Date	Name	Developer	Max Clock (first version)	Word size (bits)	Process	Transistors
1980	16032	National Semiconductor	-	16/32	-	60,000
1980	BELLMAC-32/WE 32000	Bell Labs		32		150,000
1981	6120	Harris Corporation	10 MHz	12	-	20,000 (CMOS)
1981	ROMP	IBM	10 MHz	32	2 μm	45,000
1981	T-11	DEC	2.5 MHz	16	5 μm	17,000 (NMOS)
1982	RISC-I	UC Berkeley	1 MHz	-	5 μm	44,420 (NMOS)
1982	FOCUS	Hewlett Packard	18 MHz	32	1.5 μm	450,000
1982	80186	Intel	6 MHz	16	-	55,000
1982	80188	Intel	8 MHz	8/16	-	55,000
1982	80286	Intel	6 MHz	16	1.5 μm	134,000
1983	RISC-II	UC Berkeley	3 MHz	-	3 μm	40,760 (NMOS)
1983	MIPS	Stanford University	2 MHz	32	3 μm	25,000
1983	65816	Western Design Center	-	16	-	-
1984	68020	Motorola	16 MHz	32	2 μm	190,000
1984	NS32032	National Semiconductor	-	32	-	70,000
1984	V20	NEC	5 MHz	8/16	-	63,000
1985	80386	Intel	12 MHz	32	1.5 μm	275,000
1985	MicroVax II 78032	DEC	5 MHz	32	3.0 μm	125,000
1985	R2000	MIPS	8 MHz	32	2 μm	115,000
1985	Novix NC4016	Harris Corporation	8 MHz	16	3 μm	16,000
1986	Z80000	Zilog	-	32	-	91,000
1986	SPARC MB86900	Fujitsu	15 MHz	32	0.8 μm	800,000
1986	V60	NEC	16 MHz	16/32	1.5 μm	375,000
1987	80C186	Intel	10 MHz	16	-	56,000 (CMOS)
1987	CVAX 78034	DEC	12.5 MHz	32	2.0 μm	134,000
1987	ARM2	Acorn	8 MHz	32	2 μm	25,000
1987	Gmicro/200	Hitachi	-	-	1 μm	730,000
1987	68030	Motorola	16 MHz	32	1.3 μm	273,000
1987	V70	NEC	20 MHz	16/32	1.5 μm	385,000
1988	R3000	MIPS	25 MHz	32	1.2 μm	120,000
1988	80386SX	Intel	12 MHz	16/32	-	-
1988	i960	Intel	10 MHz	33/32	1.5 μm	250,000
1989	i960CA	Intel	16–33 MHz	33/32	0.8 μm	600,000
1989	VAX DC520 "Rigel"	DEC	35 MHz	32	1.5 μm	320,000
1989	80486	Intel	25 MHz	32	1 μm	1,180,000
1989	i860	Intel	25 MHz	32	1 μm	1,000,000

== 1990s ==
The 32-bit microprocessor dominated the consumer market in the 1990s. Processor clock speeds increased by more than tenfold between 1990 and 1999, and 64-bit processors began to emerge later in the decade. In the 1990s, microprocessors no longer used the same clock speed for the processor and the RAM. Processors began to have a front-side bus (FSB) clock speed used in communication with RAM and other components. Typically, the processor itself ran at a clock speed that was a multiple of the FSB clock speed. Intel's Pentium III, for example, had an internal clock speed of 450–600 MHz and an FSB speed of 100–133 MHz. Only the processor's internal clock speed is shown here.

Date	Name	Developer	Clock	Word size (bits)	Process	Transistors (millions)	Threads
1990	68040	Motorola	40 MHz	32	-	1.2	
1990	POWER1	IBM	20–30 MHz	32	1,000 nm	6.9	
1991	R4000	MIPS Computer Systems	100 MHz	64	800 nm	1.35	
1991	NVAX	DEC	62.5–90.91 MHz	32	750 nm	1.3	
1991	RSC	IBM	33 MHz	32	800 nm	1.0	
1992	SH-1	Hitachi	20 MHz	32	800 nm	0.6	
1992	Alpha 21064	DEC	100–200 MHz	64	750 nm	1.68	
1992	microSPARC I	Sun	40–50 MHz	32	800 nm	0.8	
1992	PA-7100	Hewlett Packard	100 MHz	32	800 nm	0.85	
1992	486SLC	Cyrix	40 MHz	16			
1993	HARP-1	Hitachi	120 MHz	-	500 nm	2.8	
1993	PowerPC 601	IBM, Motorola	50–80 MHz	32	600 nm	2.8	
1993	Pentium	Intel	60–66 MHz	32	800 nm	3.1	
1993	POWER2	IBM	55–71.5 MHz	32	720 nm	23	
1994	microSPARC II	Fujitsu	60–125 MHz	-	500 nm	2.3	
1994	S/390 G1	IBM	-	32	-		
1994	68060	Motorola	50 MHz	32	600 nm	2.5	
1994	Alpha 21064A	DEC	200–300 MHz	64	500 nm	2.85	
1994	R4600	QED	100–125 MHz	64	650 nm	2.2	
1994	R8000	MTI	75-90 MHz	64	700 nm	3.43	
1994	PA-7200	Hewlett Packard	125 MHz	32	550 nm	1.26	
1994	PowerPC 603	IBM, Motorola	60–120 MHz	32	500 nm	1.6	
1994	PowerPC 604	IBM, Motorola	100–180 MHz	32	500 nm	3.6	
1994	PA-7100LC	Hewlett Packard	100 MHz	32	750 nm	0.90	
1995	Alpha 21164	DEC	266–333 MHz	64	500 nm	9.3	
1995	S/390 G2	IBM	-	32	-		
1995	UltraSPARC	Sun	143–167 MHz	64	470 nm	5.2	
1995	SPARC64	HAL Computer Systems	101–118 MHz	64	400 nm	-	
1995	Pentium Pro	Intel	150–200 MHz	32	350 nm	5.5	
1996	Alpha 21164A	DEC	400–500 MHz	64	350 nm	9.7	
1995	S/390 G3	IBM	-	32	-		
1996	K5	AMD	75–100 MHz	32	500 nm	4.3	
1996	R10000	MTI	150–250 MHz	64	350 nm	6.7	
1996	R5000	QED	180–250 MHz	-	350 nm	3.7	
1996	SPARC64 II	HAL Computer Systems	141–161 MHz	64	350 nm	-	
1996	PA-8000	Hewlett-Packard	160–180 MHz	64	500 nm	3.8	
1996	POWER2 Super Chip (P2SC)	IBM	150 MHz	32	290 nm	15	
1997	SH-4	Hitachi	200 MHz	-	200 nm	10	
1997	RS64	IBM	125 MHz	64	? nm	?	
1997	Pentium II	Intel	233–300 MHz	32	350 nm	7.5	
1997	PowerPC 620	IBM, Motorola	120–150 MHz	64	350 nm	6.9	
1997	UltraSPARC IIs	Sun	250–400 MHz	64	350 nm	5.4	
1997	S/390 G4	IBM	370 MHz	32	500 nm	7.8	
1997	PowerPC 750	IBM, Motorola	233–366 MHz	32	260 nm	6.35	
1997	K6	AMD	166–233 MHz	32	350 nm	8.8	
1998	RS64-II	IBM	262 MHz	64	350 nm	12.5	
1998	Alpha 21264	DEC	450–600 MHz	64	350 nm	15.2	
1998	MIPS R12000	SGI	270–400 MHz	64	250–180 nm	6.9	
1998	RM7000	QED	250–300 MHz	-	250 nm	18	
1998	SPARC64 III	HAL Computer Systems	250–330 MHz	64	240 nm	17.6	
1998	S/390 G5	IBM	500 MHz	32	250 nm	25	
1998	PA-8500	Hewlett Packard	300–440 MHz	64	250 nm	140	
1998	POWER3	IBM	200 MHz	64	250 nm	15	
1999	S/390 G6	IBM	550-637 MHz	32	-		
1999	Emotion Engine	Sony, Toshiba	294–300 MHz	-	180–65 nm	13.5	
1999	Pentium III	Intel	450–600 MHz	32	250 nm	9.5	
1999	RS64-III	IBM	450 MHz	64	220 nm	34	2
1999	PowerPC 7400	Motorola	350–500 MHz	32	200–130 nm	10.5	
1999	Athlon	AMD	500–1000 MHz	32	250 nm	22	

== 2000s ==
64-bit processors became mainstream in the 2000s. Microprocessor clock speeds reached a ceiling because of the heat dissipation barrier. Instead of implementing expensive and impractical cooling systems, manufacturers turned to parallel computing in the form of the multi-core processor. Overclocking had its roots in the 1990s, but came into its own in the 2000s. Off-the-shelf cooling systems designed for overclocked processors became common, and the gaming PC had its advent as well. Over the decade, transistor counts increased by about an order of magnitude, a trend continued from previous decades. Process sizes decreased about fourfold, from 180 nm to 45 nm.

Date	Name	Developer	Clock	Process	Transistors (millions)	Cores per die / Dies per module
2000	Athlon XP	AMD	1.33–1.73 GHz	180 nm	37.5	1 / 1
2000	Duron	AMD	550 MHz–1.3 GHz	180 nm	25	1 / 1
2000	RS64-IV	IBM	600–750 MHz	180 nm	44	1 / 2
2000	Pentium 4	Intel	1.3–2 GHz	180–130 nm	42	1 / 1
2000	SPARC64 IV	Fujitsu	450–810 MHz	130 nm	-	1 / 1
2000	z900	IBM	918 MHz	180 nm	47	1 / 12, 20
2001	MIPS R14000	SGI	500–600 MHz	130 nm	7.2	1 / 1
2001	POWER4	IBM	1.1–1.4 GHz	180–130 nm	174	2 / 1, 4
2001	UltraSPARC III	Sun	750–1200 MHz	130 nm	29	1 / 1
2001	Itanium	Intel	733–800 MHz	180 nm	25	1 / 1
2001	PowerPC 7450	Motorola	733–800 MHz	180–130 nm	33	1 / 1
2002	SPARC64 V	Fujitsu	1.1–1.35 GHz	130 nm	190	1 / 1
2002	Itanium 2	Intel	0.9–1 GHz	180 nm	410	1 / 1
2003	PowerPC 970	IBM	1.6–2.0 GHz	130–90 nm	52	1 / 1
2003	Pentium M	Intel	0.9–1.7 GHz	130–90 nm	77	1 / 1
2003	Opteron	AMD	1.4–2.4 GHz	130 nm	106	1 / 1
2004	POWER5	IBM	1.65–1.9 GHz	130–90 nm	276	2 / 1, 2, 4
2004	PowerPC BGL	IBM	700 MHz	130 nm	95	2 / 1
2005	IBM z9	IBM				
2005	Opteron "Athens"	AMD	1.6–3.0 GHz	90 nm	114	1 / 1
2005	Pentium D	Intel	2.8–3.2 GHz	90 nm	115	1 / 2
2005	Athlon 64 X2	AMD	2–2.4 GHz	90 nm	243	2 / 1
2005	PowerPC 970MP	IBM	1.2–2.5 GHz	90 nm	183	2 / 1
2005	UltraSPARC IV	Sun	1.05–1.35 GHz	130 nm	66	2 / 1
2005	UltraSPARC T1	Sun	1–1.4 GHz	90 nm	300	8 / 1
2005	Xenon	IBM	3.2 GHz	90–45 nm	165	3 / 1
2006	Core Duo	Intel	1.1–2.33 GHz	90–65 nm	151	2 / 1
2006	Core 2	Intel	1.06–2.67 GHz	65–45 nm	291	2 / 1, 2
2006	Cell/B.E.	IBM, Sony, Toshiba	3.2–4.6 GHz	90–45 nm	241	1+8 / 1
2006	Itanium "Montecito"	Intel	1.4–1.6 GHz	90 nm	1720	2 / 1
2007	POWER6	IBM	3.5–4.7 GHz	65 nm	790	2 / 1
2007	SPARC64 VI	Fujitsu	2.15–2.4 GHz	90 nm	543	2 / 1
2007	UltraSPARC T2	Sun	1–1.4 GHz	65 nm	503	8 / 1
2007	TILE64	Tilera	600–900 MHz	90–45 nm	?	64 / 1
2007	Opteron "Barcelona"	AMD	1.8–3.2 GHz	65 nm	463	4 / 1
2007	PowerPC BGP	IBM	850 MHz	90 nm	208	4 / 1
2008	Phenom	AMD	1.8–2.6 GHz	65 nm	450	2, 3, 4 / 1
2008	z10	IBM	4.4 GHz	65 nm	993	4 / 7
2008	PowerXCell 8i	IBM	2.8–4.0 GHz	65 nm	250	1+8 / 1
2008	SPARC64 VII	Fujitsu	2.4–2.88 GHz	65 nm	600	4 / 1
2008	Atom	Intel	0.8–1.6 GHz	65–45 nm	47	1 / 1
2008	Core i7	Intel	2.66–3.2 GHz	45–32 nm	730	2, 4, 6 / 1
2008	TILEPro64	Tilera	600–866 MHz	90–45 nm	?	64 / 1
2008	Opteron "Shanghai"	AMD	2.3–2.9 GHz	45 nm	751	4 / 1
2009	Phenom II	AMD	2.5–3.2 GHz	45 nm	758	2, 3, 4, 6 / 1
2009	Opteron "Istanbul"	AMD	2.2–2.8 GHz	45 nm	904	6 / 1

== 2010s ==
A new trend appears, the multi-chip module made of several chiplets. This is multiple monolithic chips in a single package. This allows higher integration with several smaller and easier to manufacture chips.

Date	Name	Developer	Clock	Process	Transistors (millions)	Cores per die / Dies per module	Threads per core
2010	POWER7	IBM	3–4.14 GHz	45 nm	1200	4, 6, 8 / 1, 4	4
2010	Itanium "Tukwila"	Intel	2 GHz	65 nm	2000	2, 4 / 1	2
2010	Opteron "Magny-cours"	AMD	1.7–2.4 GHz	45 nm	1810	4, 6 / 2	1
2010	Xeon "Nehalem-EX"	Intel	1.73–2.66 GHz	45 nm	2300	4, 6, 8 / 1	2
2010	z196	IBM	3.8–5.2 GHz	45 nm	1400	4 / 1, 6	1
2010	SPARC T3	Sun	1.6 GHz	45 nm	2000	16 / 1	8
2010	SPARC64 VII+	Fujitsu	2.66–3.0 GHz	45 nm	?	4 / 1	2
2010	Intel "Westmere"	Intel	1.86–3.33 GHz	32 nm	1170	4–6 / 1	2
2011	Intel "Sandy Bridge"	Intel	1.6–3.4 GHz	32 nm	995	2, 4 / 1	(1,) 2
2011	AMD Llano	AMD	1.0–1.6 GHz	40 nm	380	1, 2 / 1	1
2011	Xeon E7	Intel	1.73–2.67 GHz	32 nm	2600	4, 6, 8, 10 / 1	1–2
2011	Power ISA BGQ	IBM	1.6 GHz	45 nm	1470	18 / 1	4
2011	SPARC64 VIIIfx	Fujitsu	2.0 GHz	45 nm	760	8 / 1	2
2011	FX "Bulldozer" Interlagos	AMD	3.1–3.6 GHz	32 nm	1200	4–8 / 2	1
2011	SPARC T4	Oracle	2.8–3 GHz	40 nm	855	8 / 1	8
2012	SPARC64 IXfx	Fujitsu	1.848 GHz	40 nm	1870	16 / 1	2
2012	zEC12	IBM	5.5 GHz	32 nm	2750	6 / 6	1
2012	POWER7+	IBM	3.1–5.3 GHz	32 nm	2100	8 / 1, 2	4
2012	Itanium "Poulson"	Intel	1.73–2.53 GHz	32 nm	3100	8 / 1	2
2013	Intel "Haswell"	Intel	1.9–4.4 GHz	22 nm	1400	4 / 1	2
2013	SPARC64 X	Fujitsu	2.8–3 GHz	28 nm	2950	16 / 1	2
2013	SPARC T5	Oracle	3.6 GHz	28 nm	1500	16 / 1	8
2014	POWER8	IBM	2.5–5 GHz	22 nm	4200	6, 12 / 1, 2	8
2014	Intel "Broadwell"	Intel	1.8–4 GHz	14 nm	1900	2, 4, 6, 8, 12, 16 / 1, 2, 4	2
2015	z13	IBM	5 GHz	22 nm	3990	8 / 1	2
2015	A8-7670K	AMD	3.6 GHz	28 nm	2410	4 / 1	1
2016	RISC-V E31	SiFive	320 MHz	28 nm	?	1	1
2017	Zen	AMD	3.2–4.1 GHz	14 nm	4800	8, 16 / 1, 2, 4	2
2017	z14	IBM	5.2 GHz	14 nm	6100	10 / 1	2
2017	POWER9	IBM	4 GHz	14 nm	8000	12, 24 / 1	4, 8
2017	SPARC M8	Oracle	5 GHz	20 nm	~10,000	32	8
2017	RISC-V U54-MC	SiFive	1.5 GHz	28 nm	250	4	1
2018	Intel "Cannon Lake"	Intel	2.2–3.2 GHz	10 nm	?	2 / 1	2
2018	Zen+	AMD	2.8–3.7 GHz	12 nm	4800	2, 4, 6, 8 / 1, 2, 4	1, 2
2018	RISC-V U74-MC	SiFive	1.5 GHz	?	?	4	1
2019	Zen 2	AMD	2–4.7 GHz	7 nm, 12 nm	3900	4, 6, 8 / 1, 2, 4, 6, 8	2
2019	z15	IBM	5.2 GHz	14 nm	9200	12 / 1	2

== 2020s ==
Date	Name	Developer	Clock	Process	Transistors (millions)	Cores per die / Dies per module	Threads per core
2020	Zen 3	AMD	3.4–4.9 GHz	7 nm, 12 nm	6240–35290	4, 6, 8 / 1, 2, 4, 8	2
2020	M1 Series	Apple	3.2 GHz	5 nm	16000–144000	4–8P, 2–4E / 1, 2	1
2021	Alder Lake	Intel	0.7–5.3 GHz	7 nm	?	0–8P, 2–8E	1–2
2021	Power10	IBM	4 GHz	7 nm	18000	15	8
2022	IBM Telum	IBM	>5 GHz	7 nm	22000	8	2
2022	M2 Series	Apple	3.49/2.42 GHz	5 nm (N5P)	20000–134000	4–8P, 4E / 1, 2	1
2022	Zen 4	AMD	2.0–5.7 GHz	5 nm, 7 nm	6570	4, 6, 8 / 1, 2, 4, 8, 12	2
2023	Zen 4C	AMD	2.0–3.1 GHz	5 nm	8200	4, 6, 8, 12, 14, 16 / 1, 2, 4, 8	1, 2
2023	M3 Series	Apple	4.05/2.75 GHz	3 nm	25000–92000	4–12P, 4–6E	1
2023	Meteor Lake	Intel	0.7–5.0 GHz	5 nm, 7 nm	?	2–6P, 4–8E, 2LP-E	1–2
2024	Oryon	Qualcomm	4.3 GHz	4 nm	?	12	1
2024	M4 Series	Apple	4.4 GHz	3 nm	28000	2–12P, 4–6E	1
2024	Arrow Lake	Intel	0.7–5.7 GHz	3 nm, 5 nm	?	2–8P, 4–16E, 2LP-E	1–2
2024	Zen 5	AMD	2.0–5.7 GHz	5 nm	8315-20030	6, 8, 16 / 2, 3	2
2024	IBM Telum II	IBM	5.5 GHz	5 nm	43000	8	2
2025	Power11	IBM	4.4 GHz	7 nm	30000	16	8
2025	M5 Series	Apple	0.9-4.6 GHz	3 nm	?	3–4P, 4–6E	1

== See also ==
- History of the transistor
- Moore's law
- Transistor count per chip, chronology
- Timeline of instructions per second – architectural chip performance chronology
- Tick–tock model, and its successor:
  - Process–architecture–optimization model

== References and notes ==
Notes

- sandpile.org for x86 processor information
- Ogdin, Jerry (January 1975). "Microprocessor scorecard". Euromicro Newsletter. 1 (2): 43–77. doi:10.1016/0303-1268(75)90008-5.
