= HAL Computer Systems =

American computer manufacturer (1990–2001)

- Industry: Computer workstations
- Founded: 1990; 36 years ago
- Founder: Andrew Heller
- Defunct: 2001
- Products: HAL SPARC64

HAL Computer Systems, Inc was a Campbell, California-based computer manufacturer founded in 1990 by Andrew Heller, a principal designer of the original IBM POWER architecture. His idea was to build computers based on a RISC architecture for the commercial market. The inspiration of the name comes from the Arthur C. Clarke novel 2001: A Space Odyssey.

The company's intent to develop a high-performance microprocessor implementing the SPARC architecture prompted Fujitsu to fund the company in 1991. $40.2 million was invested in return for a 44% stake. As part of the deal:

1. Fujitsu agreed to not increase their ownership of HAL.
2. Fujitsu would fabricate HAL's microprocessor designs.
3. Fujitsu would make its patents available to HAL.
4. Fujitsu would manufacture some of the HAL machines, and market them in Asia.

In return, HAL gave Fujitsu access to the technology it was developing. By this time, HAL had 140 employees.

In mid-1993, Heller resigned from his position as chairman and chief executive officer to become a consultant to Fujitsu Ltd. HAL said Heller had been developing roadmaps for Fujitsu and its subsidiaries ICL plc and Amdahl Corporation for the six months prior to his resignation, and had been less involved with HAL's daily operation. There were suggestions that Fujitsu was dissatisfied with HAL's progress and their failure to introduce systems with their 64-bit processor, but the company had no comment on the suggestions. The position of president was taken by Scott Metcalf, who was also the chief operating officer.

In November 1993, Fujitsu paid more than $50 million for the remaining 56% of HAL it did not own. HAL became a wholly owned subsidiary of Fujitsu.

HAL was very secretive about their product plans during their operation as an independent company. Initial systems were intended for a 1994 launch.

The company produced multiple generations of computers based on microprocessors they had designed to the 64-bit SPARC V9 specification. Their processor design, known as SPARC64, combined out-of-order execution with mainframe-style reliability, availability and serviceability features. SPARC64 beat out Sun Microsystems' UltraSPARC I by a few months to be the first SPARC V9 microprocessor produced.

Most of the sales of the company went to the Japanese market. Fujitsu closed the subsidiary in mid-2001.

HAL later designed the SPARC64 II (previously known as the SPARC64+), SPARC64 III microprocessors. They also designed a microprocessor that was canceled when the division was closed by Fujitsu, known as the SPARC64 V. Fujitsu would later develop a microprocessor with the same name.

== HAL Software Systems ==
HAL Software Systems was HAL's software division. Their first product was a Distributed Computing Environment (DCE) management tool. Later products, introduced in March 1994, included the Olias Browser, Olias Build Tools, Olias Remote Information Broker, and Olias Filter Development Kit. These products were for browsing and managing Standard Generalized Markup Language (SGML) and World Wide Web documents and relational databases. In mid-1996, Fujitsu had HAL Computer Systems spin off HAL Software Systems as Chisholm Technologies, Inc., a company financed by Fujitsu that developed Intranet administration tools.
