= Master the Mainframe Contest =

Way of Showing Your Talent in Mainframe Developer

Master the Mainframe contest was a mainframe programming challenge organized annually by IBM Academic Initiative System z.

== History ==
Originally catering to students attending North American institutions of higher learning (US and Canada, excluding Quebec), the contest ran in as many as 30 countries across the globe. The goal of the contest was to provide students with the opportunity to experience working with mainframes. The contest was created in part to increase the number of mainframe skilled individuals in the computing workforce.

== Contest ==
For North America, the contest typically started during the Fall semester and run until the end of December. It was separated into 3 parts, with each part increasing in complexity. Part 1 introduced the basic aspects necessary to get started with mainframe technologies and required minimal time to complete. Part 2 involved more steps for each task and usually took a day or so to accomplish. The first 60 winners of Part 2 received monetary prizes in recognition of their achievement. Part 3 was more in depth, involving multiple programming challenges such as COBOL, REXX, JCL, etc. (depending on the questions set for the year's challenge).

== Prizes ==
Past winners of Part 3 received gifts such as iPad, iPod, laptops or netbooks. Winners also received an all-expense-paid trip to the IBM mainframe facility in Poughkeepsie, New York.
