= IBM z15 =

2019 64-bit mainframe microprocessor by IBM

z15
General information
- Launched: 2019
- Designed by: IBM

Performance
- Max. CPU clock rate: 5.2 GHz

Cache
- L1 cache: 128 KB instruction 128 KB data per core
- L2 cache: 4 MB instruction 4 MB data per core
- L3 cache: 256 MB shared

Architecture and classification
- Technology node: 14 nm
- Instruction set: z/Architecture

Physical specifications
- Cores: 12

History
- Predecessor: z14
- Successor: Telum

The z15 is a microprocessor made by IBM for their z15 mainframe computers, announced on September 12, 2019.

== Description ==
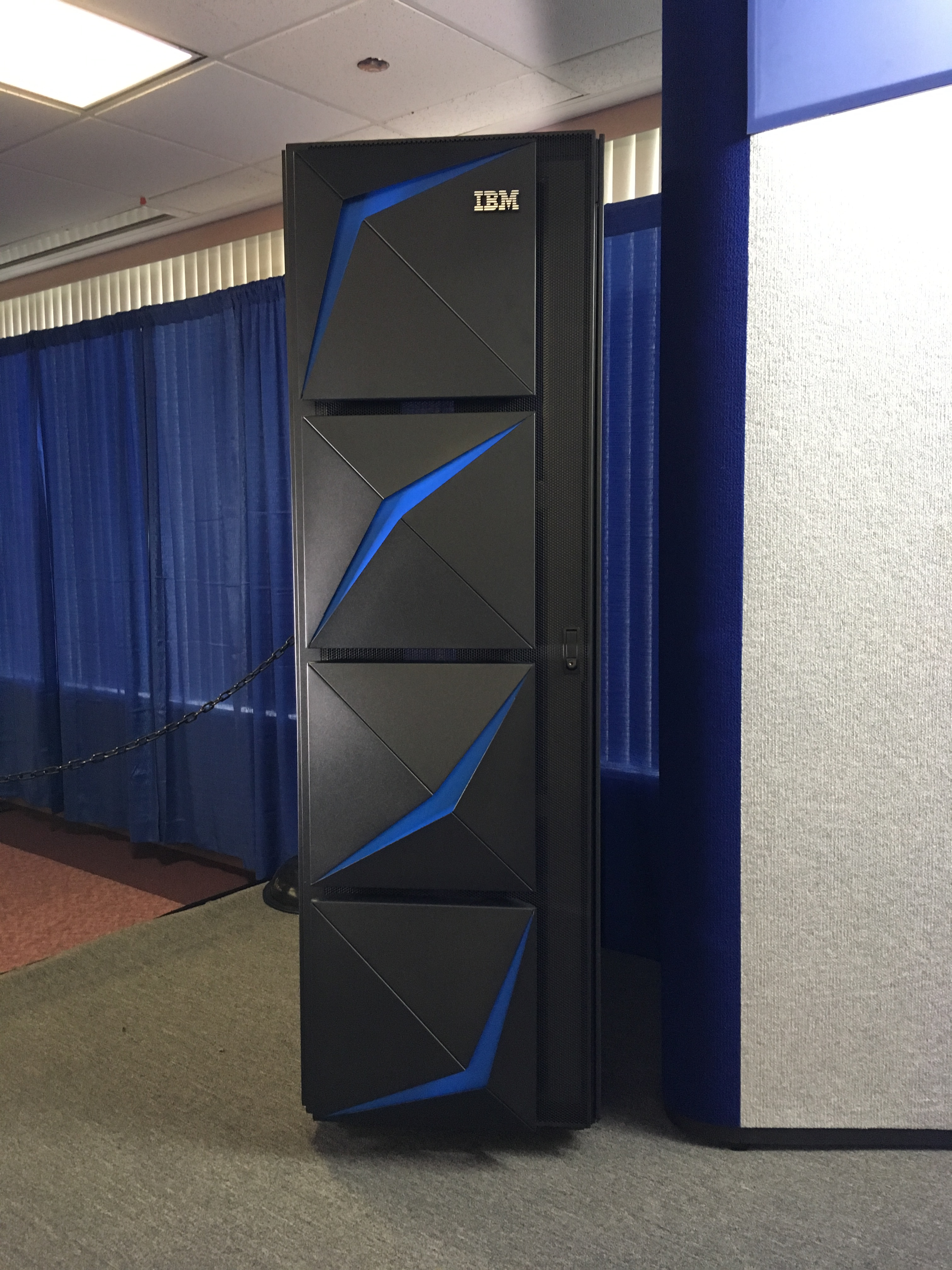
A single-frame IBM z15 mainframe. Larger capacity models can have up to four total frames. This model has blue accents, as compared with the LinuxONE III model with orange highlights.

The processor unit chip (PU chip) has 12 cores. The z15 cores support two-way simultaneous multithreading.

The cores implement the CISC z/Architecture with a superscalar, out-of-order pipeline. New in z15 is an on-chip nest accelerator unit, shared by all cores, to accelerate compression.

The cache (e.g. level 3) is doubled from the previous generation z14, while the "L4 cache increased from 672MB to 960MB, or +43%" with the new add-on chip system controller (SC) SCM. Both it and all levels of cache in the main processor from level 1 use eDRAM, instead of the traditionally used SRAM. "A five-CPC drawer system has 4800 MB (5 x 960 MB) of shared L4 cache."
