= IBM Telum =

2021 64-bit mainframe microprocessor by IBM

Telum
General information
- Launched: 2021
- Designed by: IBM
- Common manufacturer: Samsung Electronics

Performance
- Max. CPU clock rate: 5.2 GHz

Physical specifications
- Cores: 8

Cache
- L2 cache: 32 MB per core

Architecture and classification
- Technology node: 7 nm
- Instruction set: z/Architecture

History
- Predecessor: z15
- Successor: Telum II

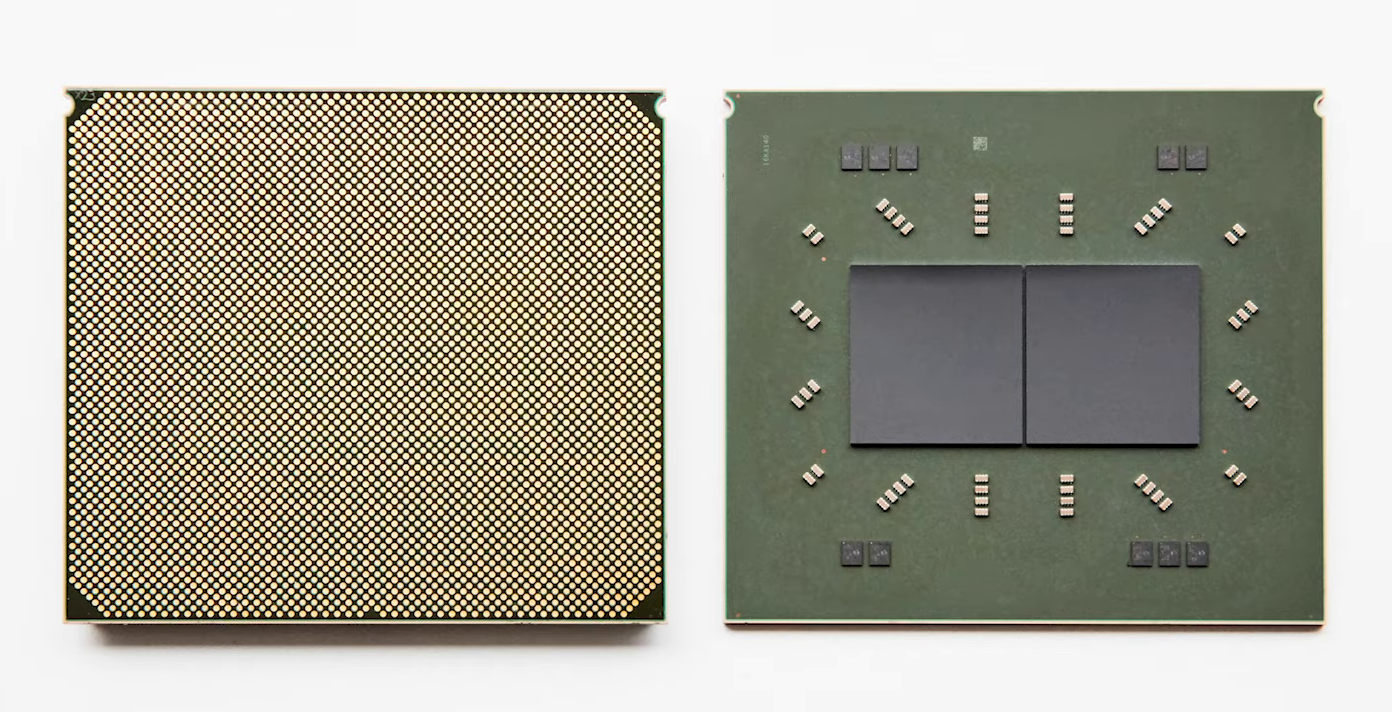
Both sides of the Telum microprocessor

Telum is a microprocessor made by IBM for the IBM z16 series mainframe computers. The processor was announced at the Hot Chips 2021 conference on 23 August 2021. Telum is IBM's first processor that contains on-chip acceleration for artificial intelligence inferencing while a transaction is taking place.

== Description ==
The chip contains 8 processor cores with a deep superscalar out-of-order pipeline, capable of achieving higher than 5 GHz clock frequency. The cache and chip-interconnection infrastructure provides 32 MB cache per core and can scale to 32 Telum chips. The cache design allows creating a system where the L2 cache of one core can be used as virtual L3 and L4 caches for another core. The Telum processor can either be water cooled or air cooled, but water cooling is required for running more than a few Telum processors in a single IBM compute drawer. Uniquely, the IBM Telum does not thermal throttle by reducing clock speed; instead it inserts sleep state instructions.

Telum adds a new 16-bit floating point format (NNP-Data-Type-1 Format) and several new instructions. The Neural Network Processing Assists (NNPA) instruction performs a variety of tensor instructions useful for neural networks. (Note: The NNPA instruction does not specify its operands; rather, General Register 0 contains a function code (FC) and General Register 1 contains the address of a parameter block. Depending on the function, the parameter block may contain up to 4 tensor descriptors.)

Telum II adds new functions to NNPA.

== See also ==
- z/Architecture
- IBM Z
- Mainframe computer

== Manuals ==
z-14
z/Architecture Principles of Operation (PDF) (Fourteenth ed.). IBM. May 2022. pp. 26-61 – 26-96. SA22-7832-13.
z-15
z/Architecture Principles of Operation (PDF) (Fifteenth ed.). IBM. April 2025. SA22-7832-14.
