= IBM 8100 DPCX =

Distributed Processing Control eXecutive (DPCX)
- Developer: IBM
- Written in: PL/S-like PL/DS language
- Working state: Discontinued
- Available in: English
- Supported platforms: IBM 8100
- License: Proprietary

DPCX (Distributed Processing Control eXecutive) was an operating system for the IBM 8100 small computer system. IBM hoped it would help its installed base of IBM 3790 customers migrate to the 8100 and the DPPX operating system. It was mainly deployed to support a word-processing system, Distributed Office Support Facility (DOSF) which was derived from the earlier IBM 3730 word-processing system.

Like DPPX, it was written in the PL/S-like PL/DS language. The applications, including much of DOSF, however, were written an interpreted language that was "compiled" using the System/370 assembler macro facility.

The 8100/DPCX/DOSF system was the first type of distributed system to connect to the IBM Distributed Office Support System (DISOSS) running on data host. Later versions of DISOSS relied on SNA Distribution System (SNADS) and eventually became peer-to-peer communication of documents which complied with Document Interchange Architecture (DIA) and Document Content Architecture (DCA) as other types of distributed system gained DISOSS support – Scanmaster, Displaywriter, and 5520 Office System.
