= IBM OfficeVision =

- Original author: IBM
- Release: May 1989
- Final release: 4 / 2003
- Operating system: VM, MVS, OS/400, OS/2
- Type: Productivity software
- License: Proprietary commercial software

OfficeVision was an IBM proprietary office support application.

== History ==
=== PROFS, DISOSS and Office/36 ===
OfficeVision started as a product for the VM operating system named PROFS (for PRofessional OFfice System) and was initially made available in 1981. Before that it was just a PRPQ (Programming Request for Price Quotation), an IBM administrative term for non-standard software offerings with unique features, support and pricing.

The first release of PROFS was developed by IBM in Endicott, NY in conjunction with Amoco Research, from a prototype named OFS developed earlier in Poughkeepsie, NY by Paul Gardner and others. Subsequent development took place in Dallas. The programmable editor XEDIT was the basis of the word processing function in PROFS, as well as in the PROFS document management functions.

PROFS itself had descended from OFS (Office System) developed also on the same laboratory and first installed in October 1974. This was a primitive solution for office automation created between 1970 and 1972, which was replacement for an in-house manual system for tracking inter-office communications.

Compared to Poughkeepsie's original in-house system, the distinctive new features added by OFS were a centralised database virtual machine (data base manager or DBM) for shared permanent storage of documents, instead of storing all documents in user's personal virtual machines; and a centralised virtual machine (mailman master machine or distribution virtual machine) to manage mail transfer between individuals, instead of relying on direct communication between the personal virtual machines of individual users. By 1981, IBM's Poughkeepsie site had over 500 PROFS users.

In 1983, IBM introduced release 2 of PROFS, along with auxiliary software to enable document interchange between PROFS, DISOSS, Displaywriter, IBM 8100 and IBM 5520 systems.

PROFS and its e-mail component, known colloquially as PROFS Notes, featured prominently in the investigation of the Iran-Contra scandal. Oliver North believed he had deleted his correspondence, but the system archived it anyway. Congress subsequently examined the e-mail archives.

Two wholly different systems also shared the OfficeVision name: OfficeVision/MVS originated from IBM DISOSS, and OfficeVision/400 from IBM Office/36.

IBM's European Networking Center (ENC) in Heidelberg, Germany, developed prototype extensions to OfficeVision/VM to support Open Document Architecture (ODA), in particular a converter between ODA and Document Content Architecture (DCA) document formats.

=== OfficeVision Family ===
There were several versions of Office Vision.

1. OfficeVision/VM ran on IBM's VM operating system and its user interface CMS.
2. OfficeVison/MVS (OV/MVS) ran on the IBM MVS Operating System on the System/370 and System/390 IBM mainframe computers.
3. OfficeVision/400 (OV/400) ran on the IBM AS/400 midrange (mini) system.

As said earlier, all these versions were derived from different systems sharing no common code, only shared a common name.

In general an OfficeVision system (which ever the platform) provided e-mail, shared calendars, and shared document storage and management, and it provided the ability to integrate word processing applications such as Displaywrite/370 and/or the Document Composition Facility (DCF/SCRIPT). IBM introduced the OfficeVision name in their May 1989 announcement, followed by several other key releases later.

=== OfficeVision/VM for Asian countries ===
OfficeVision/VM for the Far Eastern languages of Japanese, Korean and Chinese, had a different evolution.

It originated from IBM Office and Document Control System (ODPS), a DBCS-enabled porting from PROFS, plus document edit, store and search functions, similar to Displaywrite/370. It was an integrated office system for the Asian languages, that ran on IBM's mainframe computers under VM, offering such functions as email, calendar, and document processing and storing. IBM ODPS was later renamed as IBM OfficeVision/VM and its MVS version (using DISOSS) was not offered. After IBM's buyout of Lotus Development in 1995, the ODPS users were recommended to migrate to Lotus Notes.

IBM ODPS was developed in IBM Tokyo Programming Center, located in Kawasaki, Japan, later absorbed into IBM Yamato Development Laboratory, in conjunction with IBM Dallas Programming Center in Westlake, Texas, U.S., where PROFS was developed, and other programming centers. It first became available in 1986 for Japanese, and then was translated into Korean by IBM Korea and into Traditional Chinese by IBM Taiwan. It was not translated into Simplified Chinese for mainland China.

IBM ODPS consisted of four software components:

- The Office Support Program, or OFSP, was PROFS enabled to process the Double Byte Character Set of the Asian languages and added some more functions. It could handle email, address, scheduling, storing/search/distribution of documents, and switch to PROFS in English.
- The Document Composition Program, or DCP, was a porting from Document Composition Facility, enabled for processing the Double Byte Character Sets with additional functions. It allowed preparation and printing of documents, with a SCRIPT-type editing method.
- The Document Composition Program/Workstation allowed preparation of documents on IBM 5550, PS/55 and other "workstations" (personal computers), that offered IBM Kanji System functions.
- The Facsimile Program offered sending/receiving of facsimile data.

=== OfficeVision/2 ===
With the advent of the personal computer and the client–server paradigm changed the way organizations looked at office automation. In particular, office users wanted graphical user interfaces. Thus e-mail applications with PC clients became more popular.

IBM's initial answer was OfficeVision/2, which was released alongside its new generation of computers including PS/2, AS/400 and ES/390, which was a server-requestor system designed to be the strategic implementation of IBM's Systems Application Architecture.

The server, as said could run on the OS/2, VM, MVS (XA or ESA), or OS/400 operating systems, while the requester required OS/2 Extended Edition running on IBM PS/2 personal computers, or DOS. IBM also developed OfficeVision/2 LAN for workgroups, which failed to find market acceptance and was withdrawn in 1992.

IBM originally intended to deliver the Workplace Shell as part of the OfficeVision/2 LAN product, but in 1991 announced plans to release it as part of OS/2 2.0 instead:

IBM last week said some features originally scheduled to ship in OfficeVision/2 LAN will be bundled into the current release of the product, while others will be either integrated into OS/2 or delayed indefinitely... IBM's Workplace Shell, an enhanced graphical user interface, is being lifted from OfficeVision/2 LAN to be included in OS/2 2.0... The shell offers the capability to trigger processes by dragging and dropping icons on the desktop, such as dropping a file into an electronic wastebasket. Porting that feature to the operating system will let any application take advantage of the interface.

== Migration to Lotus Notes ==
With the advent of Lotus Notes and Lotus cc:Mail as an OfficeVision/2 replacement, IBM began to resell them. Ultimately, IBM solved its OfficeVision problems through the hostile takeover of Lotus Development for its Lotus Notes product, one of the two most popular products for business e-mail and calendaring.

Users of IBM OfficeVision included the New York State Legislature and the European Patent Office.

IBM discontinued support of OfficeVision/VM as of October 6, 2003. IBM recommended that its OfficeVision/VM customers migrate to Lotus Notes and Lotus Domino environments, and IBM offered migration tools and services to assist. Guy Dehond, one of the beta-testers of the AS/400, developed the first migration tool. However, OfficeVision/MVS remained available for sale until March 2014, and was still supported until May 2015, and thus for a time was another migration option for OfficeVision/VM users. OfficeVision/MVS runs on IBM's z/OS operating system.
