= IBM 6670 =

Laser printer and photocopier

- Manufacturer: IBM
- Introduced: February 14, 1979
- Discontinued: November 19, 1986

The IBM 6670 Information Distributor is a combination laser printer and plain-paper photocopier announced by IBM on 14 February 1979 as part of Office System/6. Its feature set included two-sided printing.

The New York Times described it in 1979 as "A key component of the office of tomorrow." Although Wang was first to market an intelligent copier, the 6670 is "closer to the standard envisioned."

== Development ==
IBM's Office Products Division (OPD) pursued two non-impact printing technologies during the 1970s: ink jet and laser. Their ink jet product, the IBM 6640, was introduced in 1976 as the printing component of the OS/6 word processing system. IBM's stated goal for the 6670 was to produce:

"A high-speed copying machine that can be linked electronically to computers, word-processing typewriters and other automated office equipment."

For laser printing, OPD engineers working on using a laser beam and a rotating mirror to discharge the drum of a photocopier, which they developed independently of the IBM 3800 laser printer produced by IBM's Data Processing Division. The 3800 was considered both too expensive, being priced at approximately US$250,000, and was also designed to replace high speed line printers so it did not offer the quality or features required for word processing applications.

The IBM 6670 was developed using a IBM Series III Copier Model 10, to which a laser imaging system and associated electronics was added. Due to the speed of available solid-state logic at the time, the photoconductor drum had to run at half the speed of the Series III, limiting output to 36 pages per minute, compared to the Model 10's rating of 75 copies per minute.

The key design distinction from the IBM 3800 lay in how the electrostatic drum was discharged. The 3800 discharges only the zones where toner is required (the actual letters and numbers) also called discharged-area-development, while the 6670 instead discharges the white space surrounding those characters, referred to as charged-area-development. Because of the way toner moves when attracted to a charged surface, the 3800 approach could produce a dotted appearance at the character stroke edges, while the 6670 method yielded smoother characters, closer in print quality to the IBM Selectric typewriter, which was at that time IBM's benchmark for letter-quality printing.

== Description ==
The 6670 is a page printer, meaning all formatting such as type styles, spacing, margins, and layout was resolved by internal electronics before the laser began creating the image on the photoconductor drum. The toner then transferred from the drum to the paper and was then hot-fused onto it, following the same sequence as a plain-paper copier. The original copier function was retained meaning an original could be placed on the glass platen which would be scanned by reflected light, discharging the drum in the same way. IBM also promoted a feature where a user could interrupt a print job to produce a photocopy and then have the 6670 resume printing from the print queue. In practice, effective output was 18 to 20 pages per minute once each page had been formatted.

The 6670 used a 5 milliwatt HeNe laser (compared to 25 milliwatts in the IBM 3800 or 1 milliwatt in the IBM 3666 barcode scanner), an 18-facet rotating mirror running at 8,000 RPM, and a print resolution of 240 × 240 dots per inch.

=== Printing capabilities ===
The 6670 supports a range of capabilities that required new application programming to exploit:

- Duplex printing: the unit prints on both sides of the paper. At the time of its introduction, no established IBM computer program had been written to use this feature, so customers had to create custom programming to use it.
- Electronic collation: because each page is formatted before printing, the unit produces multi-copy documents in the correct sequence from page 1 through to the last, repeating for each copy, eliminating the need for manual sorting.
- Landscape printing: tables and wide-format content can be printed across the full width of the paper using a rotated font, a feature that similarly required new customer programming to implement.
- Mixed fonts: a range of electronic type styles is available, with greater flexibility for combining fonts on a single page than the IBM 6640 offered. The time spent to prepare the image of the page varies with font complexity and character count.

Two paper drawers support combined document tasks, but no envelope-feeding mechanism is included, considered a notable omission given the equivalent facility on the IBM 6640, which limited the 6670's usefulness for programmed letter runs.

=== Models ===
There were three models

- The IBM 6670 Model I Information Distributor (6670-001) was announced 14 February 1979. The Model I could receive SNA data at 4800 bits per second and hold 6 fonts per document, 4 per page.
- The IBM 6670 Model II Information Distributor (6670-002) was announced around August 1981. The Model II could receive SNA data at 9600 bits per second and could hold 20 fonts, 14 communication loaded, 4 standard and 2 optional.
- The IBM 6670 Model III Information Distributor (6670-003) was announced Aug 2, 1983. It had no copier function and offered 25 fonts.

The IBM 6670 Information Distributor and its Collator unit (the IBM 6671) were withdrawn from marketing on November 19, 1986.

== Announcement and marketing ==
The 6670 was launched using a phased introduction, the first time OPD had done this. Rather than a simultaneous national announcement, availability was restricted initially to just three cities with a purchase price of approximately US$75,000. This phased approach reflected uncertainty about how to position this multifunction machine at that price point, as well as the need to align manufacturing output with sales volumes. The IBM plant received more than 1,000 first-day orders and had to increased production accordingly; however, customer uptake was initially slow because buyers did not know how to program the systems that used the 6670, and OPD did not yet have trained field personnel to assist them. Availability was expanded to a further six cities in June 1979, and national distribution followed in the autumn. The first year's sales quota was met on 31 December 1979. IBM supported the rollout with a dedicated marketing program titled "The Printer of Choice", built around the breadth of tasks the 6670 could handle.

== Reception and market performance ==
Uptake was hampered by inconsistent co-operation within IBM. OPD had specified communications compatibility with the OS/6 product line using 2770 BSC rather than IBM's newer Systems Network Architecture (SNA). As a result, IBM's Data Processing Division was required to announce separate programs after the 6670's release to enable SNA connectivity. An extension released in 1980 by a third party enabled "6670 .. terminal users (sic; to) send and receive data directly from other 6670s" in what The New York Times described as a form of electronic mail.

Co-operation between IBM divisions varied by product team. Those responsible for the Advanced Text Management System (ATMS) and other mainframe text-processing applications recognised the 6670's output quality and provided programming support and systems engineering assistance for joint customers. In contrast, the management team for the IBM 8100 minicomputer declined to fund 6670 compatibility, despite two large insurance companies in Hartford, Connecticut (Travelers and Aetna) having each ordered both products for distributed data processing. OPD eventually funded the programming work itself, and a number of joint installations followed, though some orders had been lost in the interim.

In late 1982 the 6670 was considered by Hewlett-Packard as competing against their HP2680A laser printer. The 6670's high price and the volume of output required to justify it at approximately 80,000 prints per month, confined its appeal to large-scale users.

== Legacy ==
The 6670's combination of laser imaging, multi-font support, duplex output, and landscape printing is regarded as anticipating desktop publishing. OPD's focus on large, high-volume console machines meant it did not pursue a smaller or lower-cost laser printer variant. Apple Computer and Hewlett-Packard, using the print engine of a Canon desktop copier, subsequently developed compact laser printers that brought desktop printing to a mass market at a fraction of the price.

== See also ==
- IBM 6640
- IBM 5520
- IBM 3800
- IBM Copier Family
- IBM System/6
