= IBM DISOSS =

Document distribution application

IBM Distributed Office Support System, or DISOSS is a centralized document distribution and filing application for IBM's mainframe computers running the MVS and VSE operating systems. DISOSS runs under both the CICS transaction processing system and the IMS/DS transaction processing system, and later versions use the SNADS architecture of peer to peer communication for distributed services.

Heterogeneous office systems connect through DISOSS to OfficeVision/MVS series. The IBM systems are OV/MVS, “OV/VM, OV/400, PS/CICS, PS/TSO, PS/PC, PROFS, and other Mail Systems Supporting SNADS and DIA. Only a single copy of DISOSS needs to be installed somewhere in the network to accomplish the connection.” A number of other vendors such as Digital Equipment Corporation, Hewlett-Packard, and Data General provided links to DISOSS.

== Functions ==
DISOSS provides document library function with search and retrieval controlled by security based on user ID, along with document translation based on Document Interchange Architecture (DIA) and Document Content Architecture (DCA). The different systems that use DISOSS for document exchange and distribution vary in their implementation of DCA and thus the end results of some combinations are only final form (FFT) documents rather than revisable form text (RFT).

It supports document exchange between various IBM and non-IBM office devices including the IBM Displaywriter System, the IBM 5520, the IBM 8100/DOSF, IBM Scanmaster, and Personal computers and word processors. It offers format transformation and printing services, and provides a rich application programming interface (API) and interfaced with other office products such as IBM OfficeVision.

== History ==
DISOSS was announced in 1980, and "was designated a strategic IBM product in 1982." It was a key part of IBM Systems Application Architecture (SAA), but suffered from a reputation as "difficult to understand" and "a resource hog." DISOSS continued to be actively marketed and supported as of 2012, although DISOSS functionality was folded into OfficeVision/MVS, which itself was discontinued.

Version 1 of DISOSS was introduced in June 1980; Colgate-Palmolive was one of the first sites to implement DISOSS version 1, and reported dissatisfaction with the poor quality of the documentation and with software bugs. IBM released version 2 in 1982, in which IBM claimed to resolve the issues which version 1 users had experienced.

DISOSS was implemented by the city government of Long Beach, California during 1983–1984.

== See also ==
- PROFS
- IBM OfficeVision
