= ACIF =

The AFP Conversion and Indexing Facility or ACIF is an Advanced Function Presentation utility program. ACIF is distributed with Print Services Facility for z/OS, z/VM, and z/VSE.

== Function ==
The AFP Conversion and Indexing Facility (ACIF) is a batch application development utility that lets users create documents by formatting line data (record format and traditional), XML data, and unformatted ASCII files into MO:DCA (Mixed Object Document Content Architecture) documents. These and other DCA documents can then be indexed and printed with IBM Infoprint Manager or IBM Print Services Facility (PSF), viewed with the AFP Workbench Viewer, or stored in an archival system.

ACIF provides indexing and resource retrieval capabilities that let users view, distribute, archive, and retrieve document files across systems and operating systems.

== Indexing ==
For AFP data streams ACIF uses the Tag Logical Element (TLE) structured field ('D3A090'x) to supply the indexing values. For non-AFP data the indexing values are extracted from the data stream using control statements that specify the line on the page, the column within the line, and the length of each field composing the index.

== Input Formats ==
ACIF accepts data from an application in these formats:

- AFP data
- Record format or traditional line data
- Mixed-mode data
- XML data
- Unformatted ASCII data (AIX and Windows only)
