= T.192 =

- Cooperative Document Handling – Complex services: Joint synchronous editing and joint document presentation/viewing
- Status: In force
- Year started: 1998
- Latest version: (06/98); June 1998
- Organization: ITU-T
- Committee: Study Group 8
- Base standards: T.190
- License: Freely available
- Website: https://www.itu.int/rec/T-REC-T.192

T.192 is a technical standard, for cooperative document handling, including joint synchronous editing and joint document presentation/viewing published in 1998, it was developed by the Standardization Sector of the International Telecommunication Union (ITU-T). The standard builds upon the Open Document Architecture by expanding it to enable joined document editing.
