= OpenOffice =

OpenOffice or open office may refer to:

== Computing ==
=== Software ===
- Apache OpenOffice (AOO), a derivative of OpenOffice.org by the Apache Software Foundation, with contribution from IBM Lotus Symphony
- OpenOffice.org (OOo), a discontinued open-source office software suite, originally based on StarOffice

=== Programming ===
- OpenOffice Basic (formerly known as StarOffice Basic or StarBasic or OOoBasic), a dialect of the programming language BASIC

=== File formats ===
- OpenDocument format (ODF), also known as Open Document Format for Office Applications, a widely supported standard XML-based file format originating from OOo
- OpenOffice.org XML, a file format used by early versions of OpenOffice.org
- Office Open XML (OOXML), a competing file format from Microsoft

== See also ==
- Open plan, a floor plan
- Open Document Architecture (ODA), document interchange format (CCITT T.411-T.424, equivalent to ISO 8613)
- OpenDoc, an abandoned multi-platform standard for compound documents, intended as an alternative to Microsoft's Object Linking and Embedding (OLE)
