= IBM 6640 =

IBM office ink jet printer

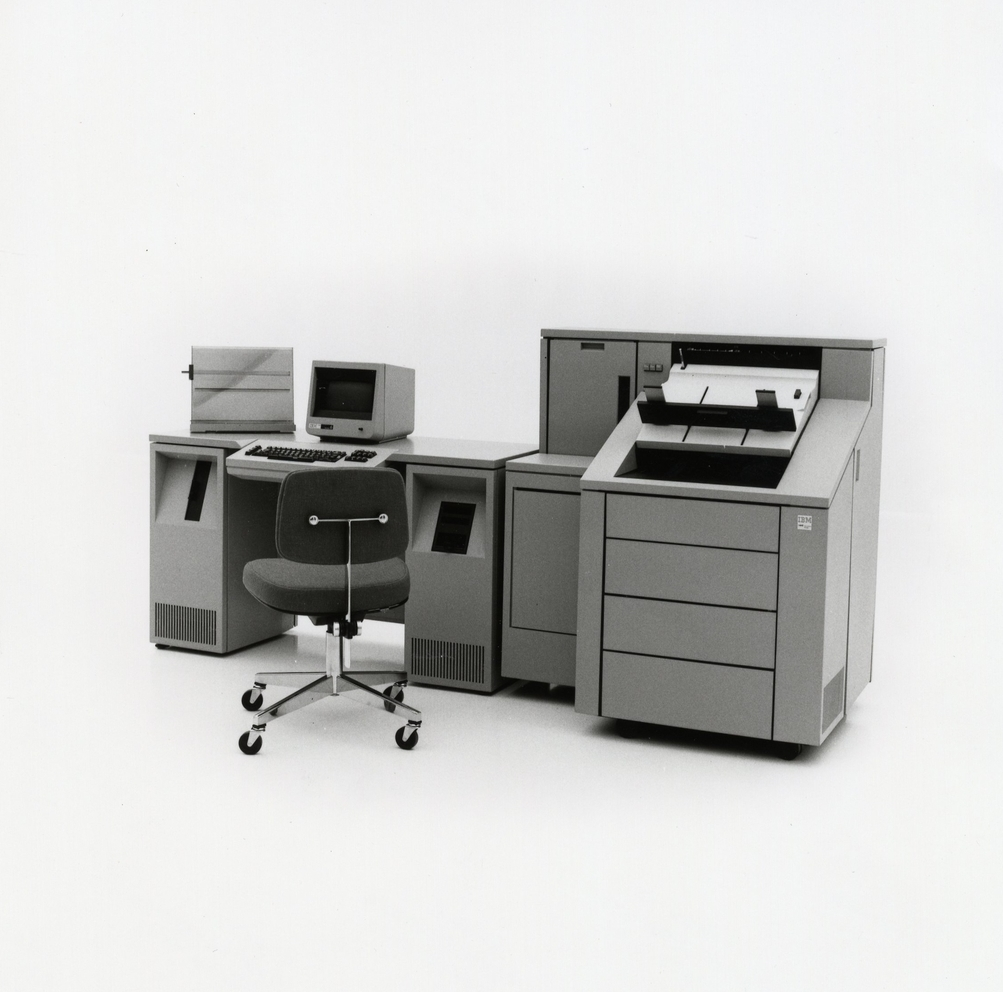
- IBM Office System/6 with an IBM 6640 printer
- Introduced: 1976
- Discontinued: 1982

The IBM 6640 printer was one of the world's first office ink jet printers. It was originally announced in June 1976 as the 46/40 before being renamed the 6640, as part of the Office System/6 word processing range.

IBM claimed the 6640 combined high-quality output with versatile and efficient automatic cut-sheet paper and envelope handling. It features automatic selection of 10-pitch, 12-pitch or proportional spacing with up to five resident fonts. The 6640 was also the first IBM printer to handle individual cut sheets rather than continuous-roll paper.

== Background ==
The scientific foundation for the 6640's printing mechanism went back to a paper published in 1879 by the British physicist Lord Rayleigh in the Proceedings of the Royal Society, in which he demonstrated mathematically how a pressurised jet of liquid breaks up into droplets of predictable and controllable size. In the early 1960s, a scientist at the Stanford Research Institute built an oscillograph that recorded electrical signals using the ink jet principle. Around the same time, two engineers at the Clevite Corporation patented an ink jet mechanism capable of forming printed characters; A. B. Dick Company subsequently acquired these patents. A division of A. B. Dick called Videograph Operations began selling the Model 9600 Videojet in 1969, which it claimed was the world's first continuous inkjet printer, used primarily for marking products such as beverage cans.

== Development and manufacturing ==
An advanced technology group within IBM's Office Products Division (OPD) in San Jose concluded in the early 1970s that the continuous jet process could achieve print quality comparable to the IBM Selectric typewriter. IBM entered a cross-licensing agreement with A. B. Dick in 1972 on that basis. The Office System/6 product line was developed by OPD in Austin, Texas, under a group led by Fred May, which was formed specifically to focus on media-based office systems rather than typewriters, copiers, or supplies.

Development of the print mechanism itself was led by Bill Buehner, an electrical engineer and programme manager based at IBM's Lexington, Kentucky facility, who took charge of the ink jet technology project in 1972. Ink formulation was the responsibility of Don Elbert, a chemical engineer who had previously worked on the ink system for the IBM Correcting Selectric Typewriter ribbon. The print mechanism was assembled in Lexington and then shipped to Austin, where it was integrated with the rest of the 6640.

== Operation ==
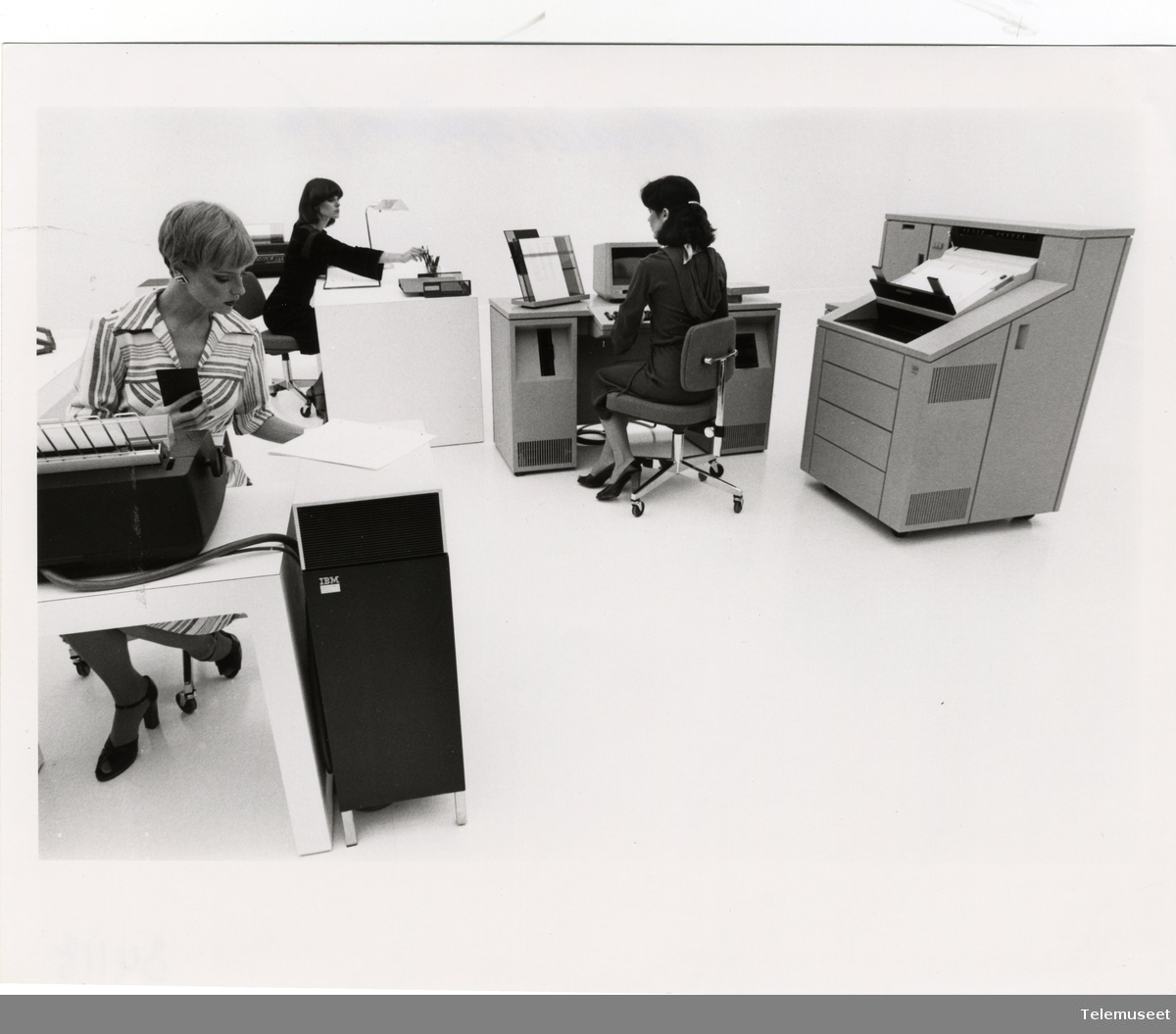
This is a photo promoting the IBM Office System/6

Documents to be printed are first prepared either on magnetic cards using a Magnetic Card Selectric typewriter, or on an Office System/6 console. Magnetic card stacks are loaded via a reader attached to the left side of the printer, and the device can also communicate via BSC or SDLC protocols. The printer on an Office System/6 model 6/440 or 6/450 is an IBM 6640 without a magnetic card reader, hard-wired to the console for direct printing. In the photograph of the IBM Office System/6, the 6640 without magnetic card reader is shown on the right; the magnetic card reader is located directly to the right of the chair.

The printer has an envelope drawer holding approximately 500 envelopes as well as two paper drawers each holding up to 600 sheets, accepting paper up to 17 by 17 inches. Optional font cards are available and are installed onto a planar board on the right side of the unit. The magnetic card feed slot accepts up to 200 control and document cards, and IBM claimed this capacity allowed the printer to run unattended for several hours.

=== Ink jet mechanism ===
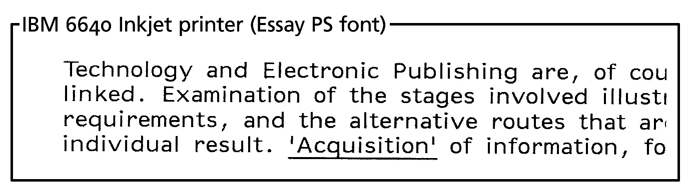
IBM 6640 output

Black ink is ejected from a single nozzle 3/16 inch (4.8 mm) long, shaped as a truncated cone, with an orifice 0.0013 inches (0.033 mm) in diameter. Because the orifice is too small to measure by conventional means, its diameter is verified during manufacture by measuring the rate of ink flow through the jet. A sealed reservoir holds six fluid ounces of ink — sufficient for approximately five million printed characters — and a small pump drives the ink under pressure into the nozzle.

Uniform droplet formation is achieved through the principles described by Lord Rayleigh: a piezoelectric ceramic crystal bonded to the wide end of the nozzle is driven by an applied voltage, causing it to flex at a controlled frequency and impose a regular instability on the jet stream. This breaks the stream into droplets at the rate of 117,000 per second.

As the droplets form, they pass through a charging tunnel that imparts a selective electrical charge to a small proportion of them. The stream then traverses an electrostatic field generated by high-voltage deflection plates; charged drops are deflected onto the paper, while uncharged drops continue straight into a gutter and are recirculated. The angle of deflection of each charged drop is determined by the magnitude of its charge, allowing individual drops to be placed precisely within a character matrix. On average, 146 drops are required to form a single character. From nozzle to paper, drops travel at speeds of up to 40 miles per hour (64 km/h) across a distance of approximately one inch.

The print head travels from left to right during printing, returning at approximately 4.5 times the printing speed; the paper advances one line during the return. Characters are built from the bottom to top as the vertical deflection of drops combines with the horizontal movement of the carrier. When idle, the ink jet is shut off automatically to minimise evaporative losses, and a fast-acting valve restores full jet pressure almost instantly on resumption.

The IBM 6640 uses a dot structure of 24×40 (960 dots) to render each character, compared with dot structures as coarse as 5×7 (35 dots) used by contemporary competitors, which was made possible by IBM's use of microelectronics.

=== Ink formulation ===
A water base was selected for the ink because water is electrically conductive which was a requirement for the electrostatic charging mechanism. It was non-toxic and non-flammable. All metallic components in contact with the ink had to be made of stainless steel to resist corrosion. The formulation includes an additive to inhibit the growth of fungus, which would otherwise accumulate and block the nozzle, and a further additive was used to prevent the ink from forming a crust at the orifice when the printer is not in use. The ink contains no fast-drying agents, as these would degrade print quality; instead, the printer exposed to the paper to a heating element as it exits the printer, ensuring the ink sets within approximately ten seconds.

=== Development challenges ===
Early testing of the mechanism resulted in misdirected ink spray so the engineering team had to devise both the precise charging scheme and a detailed model of aerodynamic and electrostatic interactions between adjacent drops in flight. To study these interactions, the team constructed a testing apparatus which was a television camera focused through a microscope onto the jet stream and projecting an enlarged image onto a video screen that allowed the behaviour of individual drops to be observed directly.

Manufacturing the nozzle assembly required entirely new production methods. The precision components had to be assembled by hand in a clean environment to prevent particulate contamination of the ink circulation system. The nozzle orifice itself had to be drilled under a microscope, and its effective diameter then confirmed by flow-rate measurement rather than direct gauging.

== Models ==
There were two models:

- 6640-001 — Announced in June 1976; prints at up to 92 characters per second. Withdrawn from marketing on 1 November 1982.
- 6640-002 — Announced in 1979; prints at up to 184 characters per second. Withdrawn from marketing on 1 November 1982.

== Commercial failure ==
While the 6640 and the broader Office System/6 (OS/6) product line initially enjoyed some sales success, it was ultimately a commercial failure, a situation which arose from a combination of technical, strategic, and organisational shortcomings.

There was no replacement product. Both IBM and Diconix introduced printers based on continuous inkjet technology, but both products failed due to their cost and complexity. Neither could compete with daisy-wheel printers in terms of reliability.

IBM introduced the DisplayWriter in 1980 as a successor but the delay proved fatal to the division's share in the word processing market.
