= IBM OS/6 =

Word processor

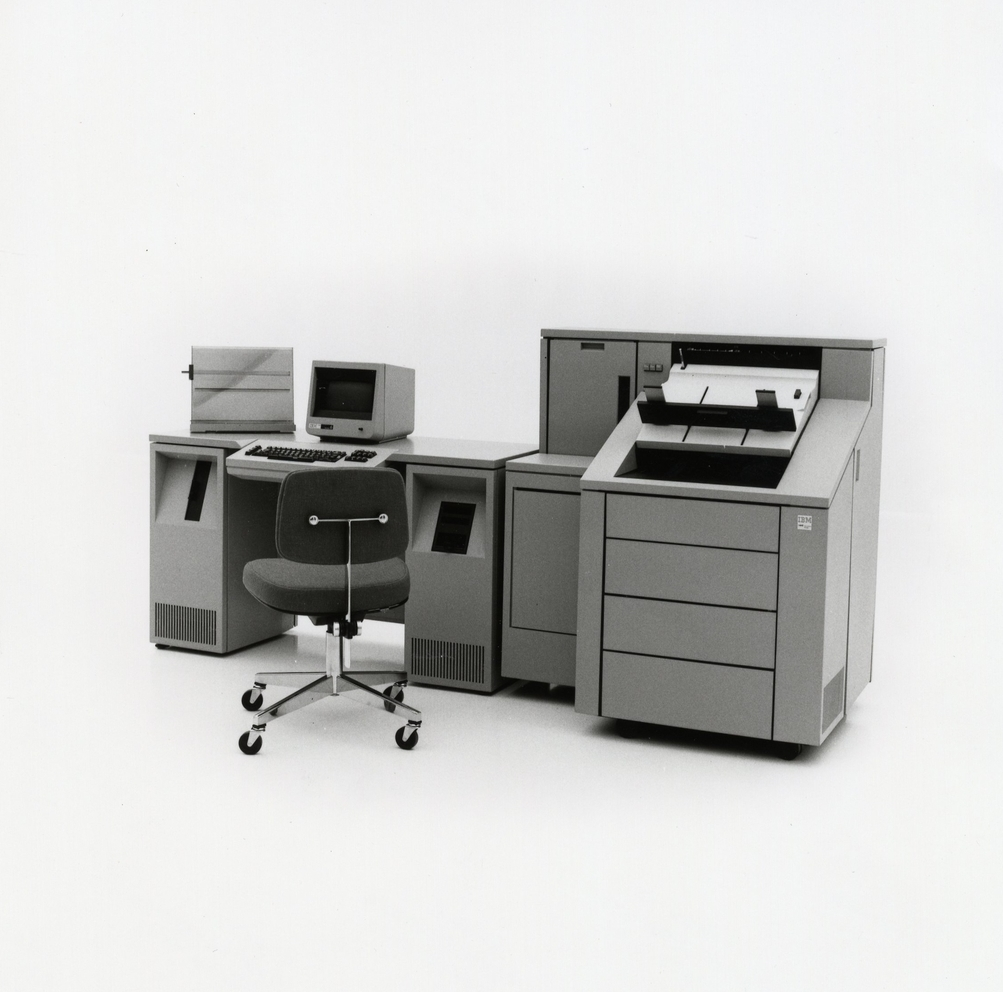
- IBM Office System/6 with printer
- Developer: IBM's Office Products Division (OPD)
- Manufacturer: IBM
- Type: Word processor
- Released: January 1977; 49 years ago
- Availability: Discontinued
- CPU: OPD Mini Processor
- Storage: 8-inch floppy diskette, magnetic stripe card
- Display: 9" text CRT
- Backward compatibility: Mag Card Selectric
- Successor: IBM Displaywriter

OS/6 (Office System/6 or System 6) is a standalone word processor made by IBM's Office Products Division (OPD), introduced in January, 1977. OS/6 was superseded by the IBM Displaywriter in 1980.

== Overview ==
The System 6 consists of a console with a keyboard, an 8 line 9" CRT character display and either an IBM 46/40 ink jet printer (later renamed the IBM 6640) or a daisy wheel printer. Documents are stored on 8-inch floppy diskettes and magnetic stripe card, which is exchangeable with IBM's previous generation of Mag Card Selectrics. The display is pre-WYSIWYG, so special symbols are displayed for text mark formatting information that the user can edit. Navigation is pre-mouse and uses arrow keys.

In an age before PCs, when typing was still done primarily only by clerical staff, the OS/6 was intended for what IBM envisioned as centralized word processing centers at large organizations. It includes features like mail merge, very high print quality with many formatting options and printers that can feed envelopes or sheets from two drawers, usually referred to within IBM as letterhead and second sheet. Data from Office System/6 can be migrated to IBM 5110 and 5120 with third-party applications.

Internally, the OS/6 uses an IBM proprietary 16-bit single-chip microprocessor called the OPD Mini Processor. This processor is a single-chip FET microprocessor that has a 16-bit little-endian instruction set built on an 8-bit internal architecture. Sixteen general-purpose registers, implemented as a 32-byte window in memory that operated as a stack, could be used as instruction operands or for indirect references to operands in memory.

== History ==
Development on OS/6 was done in the "Rio" project at IBM's Austin, Texas facilities. A proposed video display upgrade for the Selectric Mag Card II had been rejected. Instead, it was announced in 1977 that Mag Card II users would be able to add a communications option to link up with System 6.

In a 1977 presentation the System 6 was shown with the models 6/430, 6/440, and 6/450. One year later the models 6/442 and 6/452 were shown additionally. System 6 building blocks are monitor, keyboard, magnetic card unit, inkjet, and daisy wheel printers, and a floppy disk station.

In 1978, a stand-alone CPU (without magnetic card and printing capabilities) was added to the product line, the IBM 6/420 Information Processor.

In 1979, a communication-enabled laser printer and photocopier combination was introduced, the IBM 6670 Information Distributor.

Also in 1979, IBM General Systems Division (GSD) introduced IBM 5520 systems, not related to System 6, with some overlapping functionality and performance.

== Commercial failure ==
While the 6640 and the broader Office System/6 (OS/6) product line initially enjoyed some sales success, it was ultimately a commercial failure, a situation which arose from a combination of technical, strategic, and organisational shortcomings.

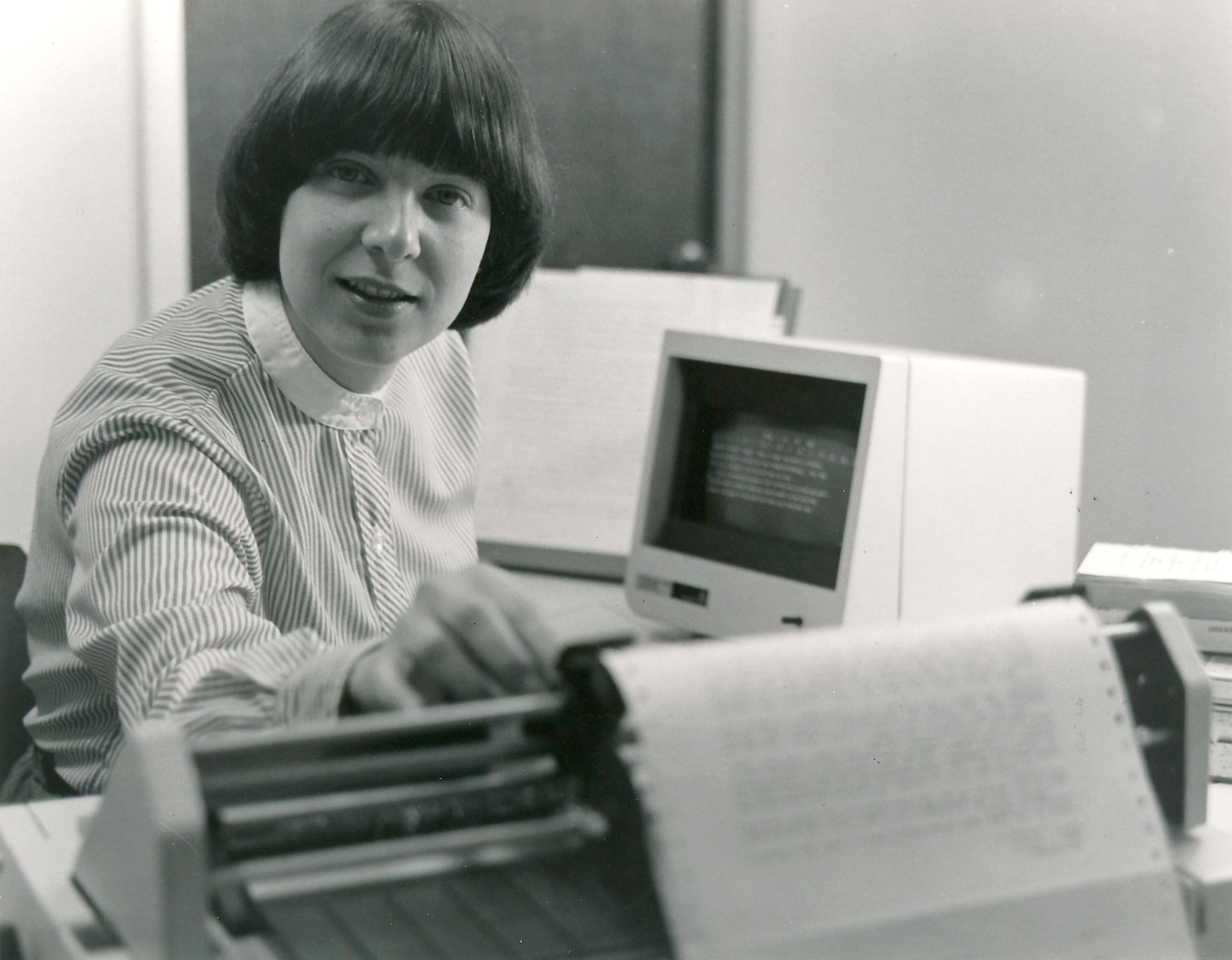
OS/6 workstation showing the 2 lines of status information and 6 lines of text

- The OS/6 workstation display was limited to eight lines on the screen: two for status information and six of text. This was at a time when rival products from Wang Laboratories and smaller start-ups were offering full-page CRT screens. Competitors had begun marketing the IBM machines as "blind typewriters" to highlight the contrast.
- Rather than adopting media based microcode that field engineers could patch using floppy disks when defects were discovered, IBM's Office Products Division encoded the OS/6 programs directly onto chip; so correcting a fault required creating and shipping a new chip with a patched version of the software, a process that took approximately six months, leaving customers with unresolved problems and no recourse.
- The division chose to retain magnetic card media as the sole local storage medium for the 6640 at the point when floppy disks were becoming the industry standard.
- The OS/6's communications implementation relied on the 2770 bisynchronous protocol which a batch-oriented mode that IBM's own Data Processing Division was actively phasing out in favour of SNA. This left OS/6 poorly positioned within the wider IBM product portfolio and undermined interdivisional co-operation in selling the line.

Underlying all of these decisions was a strategic miscalculation: the division's planners had assumed that centralised word processing centres would define the future office, a model that was already being overtaken by standalone workstations and use of desktop computers. Sales representatives were allocated only weeks of training on the new OS/6, compared with the full year given to equivalent roles in the Data Processing Division, and the training material that was produced emphasised industry-specific applications rather than the general office workflows that actually drove purchasing decisions. Although IBM introduced the DisplayWriter in 1980 as a successor, the delay proved fatal to the division's share in the word processing market.

== See also ==
- IBM 6640
