= DocuTech =

DocuTech is the name given to a line of electronic production-publishing systems produced by Xerox Corporation. It allowed paper documents to be scanned, electronically edited, and then printed on demand. DocuTech systems were the last known to use the XNS protocol for networking.

The very first DocuTech system, known as the DocuTech Production Publisher was announced on October 2, 1990. Its 135 page-per minute, black and white, xerographic print engine and attached finisher module were largely based on ones previously developed for the Xerox 5090 Duplicator system (announced by Xerox in 1988). However, image generation in the DocuTech was performed using a digitally driven, dual-beam, Laser ROS (Raster Output Scanner) rather than by the light-lens optics and exposure lamps found in the "analog" 5090 system. The system's scanner module allowed document scanning in a number of modes including manually from the platen or automatically using a 23 page-per-minute recirculating document feeder. The scanner also had a semi-automatic side feeder which could be used to scan large originals and computer fan-fold (CFF) input. The entire system was controlled by an electronic sub-system (ESS) of a proprietary Xerox design. The ESS incorporated a large number of Xerox proprietary Mesa processors which were specifically designed for high-speed image processing, 32 MegaBytes of RAM, I/O control interfaces for communicating with the Printer and Scanner modules, as well as 3 disk drives which contained system software and space for storing images (including those for saved jobs). The network connectivity to allow sending print jobs over was absent on release, but planned for the following year.

With its ability to digitally scan, edit and store documents for later retrieval, and also its ability to output stitched or tape-bound books, the DocuTech Production Publisher was arguably the first fully integrated "print-on-demand" publishing system. In fact, the Xerox DocuTech line of publishing systems is largely credited with establishing the "print-on-demand" industry.

In late 1991, Xerox re-branded the original DocuTech Production Publisher as the DocuTech Production Publisher Model 135 (DT135). This was done to distinguish it from the DocuTech Production Publisher Model 90 which the company anticipated announcing in 1992. The model numbers were chosen to reflect the page-per-minute print speeds of the two models. The controller and scanner were common to both models, but the Model 90 used a different print engine based on one developed for the previously announced Xerox 4090 printer.

The original DocuTech Production Publisher was capable of scanning and then printing black-and-white pages at up to 135 pages per minutes (for letter or A4 sizes) with an output resolution of 600 x 600 dots per inch (dpi). Scanned documents could be saved to a special memory area on disk known as the "Save Queue" where they could be retained, edited if desired (using the built in editor), and later printed "on demand". The system was also capable of printing on sheet sizes up to 14x17 inches. Another important feature of this earliest DocuTech was its ability to perform signature imposition and generate "2-up signatures" (later 4-up was added) in the proper page imposition order to create signature booklets. (note: Folding, trimming, and stitching of booklets was done by an optional accessory known as a C.P. Bourg Signature Booklet Maker or SBM-1, which could be attached in-line to the system's output finisher.)

In June 1992 Xerox announced the DocuTech 135 Network Publisher which augmented the earlier DocuTech's capability by enabling it to receive and print documents transmitted over a network. Although this system's network connectivity was limited to Xerox's proprietary XNS network, a DocuTech Network Server was also offered which enabled the now growing family of DocuTech Publishing Systems to be utilized with a broader set of networks.

The DocuTech 6135 is an improved version of the DT135, with a Sun Blade workstation controller replacing the original controller and scanner. Additional improvements include an optional VLD laser assembly, which uses sub-pixel dot positioning, while not truly increasing the print resolution to 600 x 1200 dpi, improves the halftone quality.

The DocuTech system's main competitor in the field of print-on-demand production plant is IBM's InfoPrint system. In addition, there are a number of other competitors in the field, led by the Kodak Digimaster Production Printer, which is sold under a number of different brand names, including the Canon imageRUNNER and the IBM InfoPrint. Xerox retired the original DocuTech 135 platform in favor of the DocuTech 61xx and later, the Nuvera systems (originally introduced as the DocuTech 100/120 Copier/Printer).

== See also ==
- Xerox
- IBM
- Print on demand
- .rdo
