= IBM Intelligent Printer Data Stream =

Software interface for managing printers

Intelligent Printer Data Stream (IPDS) is Info Print Solution Company's Systems Application Architecture host-to-printer data stream for Advanced Function Presentation subsystems. It provides an attachment-independent interface for controlling and managing all point addressable (APA) printers that allow the presentation of pages containing an architecturally unlimited mixture of different data types, including text, image, graphics, bar code, and object container. It is used by a variety of Info Print and OEM print servers that drive all points addressable (APA) page printers. Generally, these printers are at the medium to the high end of the print speed and volume spectrum.

"One of the strengths of IPDS is that independent applications can create source data for each data block. The output of these independent applications is merged at the printer to create an integrated mixed data page."

The IPDS architecture allows for both spooled data and print job management to flow bidirectionally between the print server (or print driver) and the Printer Controller.

Examples of print job management controls are:

- Printer resolution
- Media jam
- Pre- or post-processor exceptions
- Storage usage
- Paper tray capabilities
- Duplexing capabilities

Examples of spooled data can be:

- Positioning Information for locating objects within the page
- Fonts
- Text
- Images
- Bar codes
- Electronic overlays

IPDS data streams are purely used to carry print information and data. This is above the network transport layer (typically TCP/IP or SNA) and the supporting hardware LANs, channels, and network controllers.

IPDS carries data and instructions from the print server to the printer in structured fields. The printer controller processes these IPDS commands and returns an acknowledgment to the print server.

Similar to PPDS, IPDS uses binary encoded commands and parameters, but IPDS is not compatible with PPDS.

"IPDS is the 'online' way being used to print AFP (Advanced Function Presentation) documents. They can also be printed using the AFPDS format 'offline'."

== Printers ==
A number of printers support IPDS directly.

- Compuprint—"Heavy Duty IPDS Desktop Matrix Printers in speeds of up to 1100 CPS"
- HP—various printers using a plug-in Flash memory device.
- IBM—IBM no longer manufactures printers.
- Printronix—"IPDS Matrix Line Printers in speeds of 500 LPM, 1000 LPM, 1500 LPM, and 2000 LPM"
- Ricoh—"IPDS Matrix Line Printers in speeds of 500 LPM, 1000 LPM, 1500 LPM and 2000 LPM. Heavy Duty IPDS Desktop Matrix Printers in speeds of up to 1100 CPS"
- Tally-Dascom—Heavy Duty IPDS Desktop Matrix Printers in speeds of up to 1000 CPS
- Zebra—Thermal & Thermal Transfer Printers for Printing Labels and Bar Codes

A number of print servers are available from companies such as MPI Tech, IPDS Printing Solutions, IOCorp, Xerox, and Microsoft.

== See also ==
- MO:DCA, Mixed Object Document Content Architecture
