= MODCA =

MO:DCA
- Filename extension: .mda, .ica, .mmr, .mca
- Internet media type: image/, document/
- Type code: MO:DCA
- Magic number: X'D3', X'D3A8', X'D3A9'
- Developed by: IBM
- Type of format: Image file format, Document file format
- Extended from: Document Content Architecture

MO:DCA (Mixed Object:Document Content Architecture) is an IBM compound document format for text and graphics elements in a document. The 'Mixed Object' refers to the fact that an MO:DCA file can contain multiple types of objects, including text, images, vector graphics, and barcodes. (Note: To generate a barcode an application provides a string of digits along with controls that identify a specific type of barcode, and the rendering of bars will be done on the output platform (physical printer hardware or software emulation).)

== Overview ==
MO:DCA supports Revisable Documents, which are editable like revisable-form text, Presentation Documents, which provide specific output formatting similar to final-form text, and Resource Documents, which hold control information such as fonts. An MO:DCA file consists of a sequential, ordered hierarchy of independent objects - documents, pages, data objects, and resource objects such as fonts and ICC profiles. Each object is delimited by begin/end structures, and objects to be rendered specify presentation parameters and resource requirements in structures called "environment groups". Since the pages in MO:DCA documents appear in sequential order, presentation can start as soon as the first page is received.

Formats for specific objects are specified in various OCAs (Object Content Architectures): PTOCA for presentation text that has been formatted for output, GOCA for vector graphics objects, IOCA for bitmapped Images, FOCA for fonts, and BCOCA for barcodes. MO:DCA is implemented as IBM's Advanced Function Presentation (AFP) page description language.

A number of applications use MO:DCA, including eViewer, a MO:DCA viewer used by IBM solutions, IBM DisplayWrite, and printers and other devices supporting AFP.

=== Encoding ===
MO:DCA-P carries text, image, and graphics data objects, therefore the data is a mixture of binary data and character data. The recommended content-transfer-encoding is base64.

=== Security ===
MO:DCA-P is a specification of final-form presentation data of an Image. It is not a programming language, does not contain any file operators, and therefore cannot corrupt a receiver's file system or programming environment. MO:DCA and Mixed Object Document Content Architecture are trademarks of the IBM Corporation.

=== Interoperability ===
MO:DCA-P defines interchange sets to support interoperability. Currently defined sets are Interchange Set 1 (IS/1) and Interchange Set 2 (IS/2).

== See also ==
- IBM Intelligent Printer Data Stream (IPDS)
