= IBM copiers =

Line of photocopiers designed and manufactured by IBM

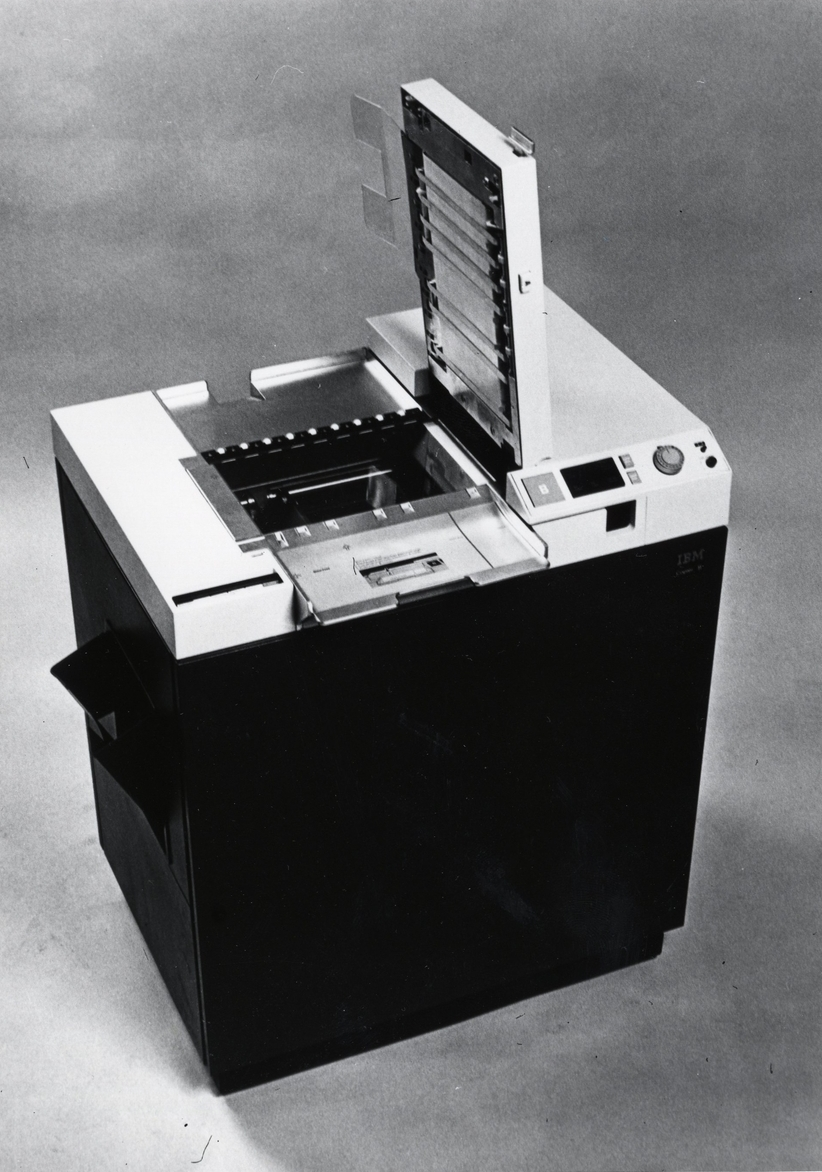
- Introduced: 1970
- Discontinued: 1988

IBM's Office Products Division (OPD) manufactured and sold copier equipment and supplies from 1970 till IBM withdrew from the copier market in 1988. IBM's decision to compete in this market resulted in the first commercial use of an organic photoconductor that was later widely used in many photocopiers. It is often held up as an example of a corporate u-turn, where a company rejects a technology and then adopts it. It also showed that despite the size of IBM's sales and engineering organisations, this did not guarantee success in every market it chose to compete in. The development effort that resulted in the IBM Copier helped in the development of IBMs first laser printer, the IBM 3800.

== IBM, Xerox and Xerography ==
In the 1930s, Chester Carlson, the inventor of the photocopier, began his research into what came to be called Xerography. Having made good progress by the early 1940s, he began looking for investors, approaching many office supplies companies including IBM. IBM reportedly rejected his proposal because they felt that carbon paper was a cheaper alternative. He eventually found an investor in the Haloid Corporation, however they struggled to finish the product and approached IBM to offer them what became the Xerox 914. IBM hired consulting firm Arthur D. Little to assess the technology, but that assessment was negative, so IBM did not invest in the product. Haloid invested heavily and launched the Xerox 914 in 1959. By 1961 Haloid (now renamed to Xerox) was making $66m USD in revenue and in 1965 their revenues were over $500m USD. In 1970 Xerox held 70% of what was then a one billion dollar (USD) Global copier market. At that time there were more than 40 companies competing with Xerox, but they all had to use coated paper (rather than plain paper), due to Xerox refusing to license their patent on the selenium drum technology, which was key to using plain paper.

In 1966 two IBM Scientists working at the IBM Research Lab in San Jose, Meredith David Shattuck and Ulo Vahtra, developed and patented an organic photoconductor with sufficient light sensitivity to be used in a copier, earning them $110,000 in IBM Inventors Awards. Meanwhile, in 1965 George Castro (PhD), authored a doctoral thesis at Dartmouth College that demonstrated that organic materials could conduct electricity when exposed to light. At that time this was a significant scientific achievement and led to an opportunity to conduct more research in this area at the California Institute of Technology in Pasadena in 1967. IBM hired him as a Research Staff Member in 1968 to help in the development of Organic PhotoConductors, a project he came to manage and which was key to IBM's development of both the Copier I and the IBM 3800. IBM needed this both to avoid patent infringement with Xerox (who used a photoconductor based on selenium) and to let them use plain paper in their Copiers. An IBM Think Magazine article written in May 1975 described the development of the organic photoconductor as one of the Research Divisions "prime achievement in the noncomputer field". While George Castro has been referred to as the inventor of the IBM Copier, it was Shattuck and Vahtra who were specifically mentioned in IBMs legal battles with Xerox around patents.

Another difference that IBM achieved was developing a dry hot roll that did not require silicone oil to fuse the toner onto paper without the toner sticking to the roll.

When IBM announced its first Copier product in April 1970, Xerox immediately sued IBM for breaching 22 patents despite IBM having licensed many of these patents for use in computer printers. In August 1973 Xerox filed a supplemental lawsuit after the launch of the Copier II. The two lawsuits were consolidated, but remained in pre-trial stage. In November 1975 IBM counter-sued Xerox for infringing an IBM Patent. Their various lawsuits were finally settled in 1978 by an exchange of patents and a payment by IBM to Xerox of US$25 million.

IBMs market share of the worldwide copier market in 1975 was 5%. By 1977 it was reportedly as high as 10%. By 1980 it was 4% and by 1985 it was only 3%.

There were three significant product releases in the IBM Copier family: The IBM Copier, the IBM Copier II and the IBM Series III Copier.

== IBM Copier ==
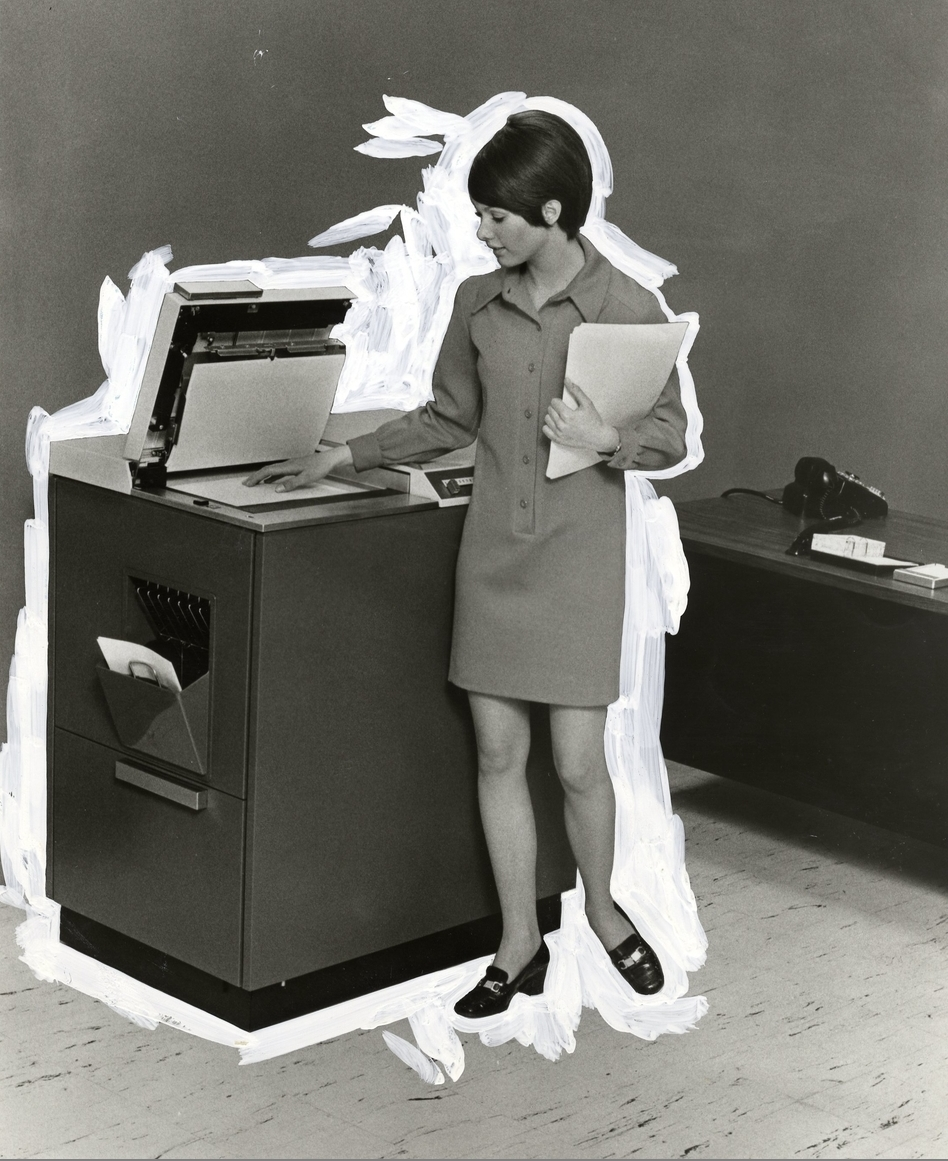
IBM Copier I

On April 21, 1970, IBM announced their first copier simply called the IBM Copier.

- Its IBM Machine type/Model is 6800–001.

When the IBM Copier II was released, IBM renamed the IBM Copier to the IBM Copier I. In terms of competition, while the Copier I was faster than the Xerox 914 (which ran at 7 copies per minute) it was reported as competing with the desktop Xerox 660 that could make 11 copies per minute.

Xerox reportedly purchased a Copier I shortly after it was released and ran it for two shifts per day for three months. It performed so well that they concluded it was a very reliable machine, reliable enough to make 50,000 copies per month.

The Copier I is significant in Electrophotography as it is the first commercial product to use an organic photoconductor.

The Copier I has the following features:

- It can create 10 copies per minute, 600 copies per hour
- Has a user replaceable 1.5 pound toner cartridge that is designed to provide enough toner for one month IBM claimed it was as easy to change as a tape cassette and because it was transparent, the operator could easily see how much toner was left. One carton, estimated for 33,000 copies, contained two cartridges.
- Developer mix is rated to last 160,000 copies and comes in a 7 lb (3.2 kg) box that is supplied and installed by an IBM Service Representative.
- Uses a roll of paper rather than cut sheets. Each roll provides approximately 625 letter-size copies. The user can use a selector button to choose between letter (8.5 in × 11 in (22 cm × 28 cm)) or legal (8.5 in × 14 in (22 cm × 36 cm)) size and a copy selector to choose from one to ten copies. Both paper sizes are cut from the same roll, meaning there is no need to load different paper sizes.
- A delivery pocket which can hold approximately 75 copies
- The first copy is produced in 15 seconds with subsequent copies every 6 seconds.
- A six digit copy counter. The client is expected to mail a copier usage card to IBM every month since rental charges include a usage fee.
- A curved sheet photoconductor that has a life expectancy of 4000 copies. The copier holds 40 photoconductors, meaning the photoconductor unit needs to be replaced by an IBM Service Representative after 160,000 copies. There is a two digit display to track how many copies a photoconductor has done and an internal end-photoconductor indicator light to inform the service representative that the copier is on its last image area.
- An Emergency off button to stop the copier if needed.
- When making copies, the cover has to be lowered onto the object to be copied, which cannot be more than 1 in (25 mm) thick. When the start bar is depressed, the cover latches into place, preventing the cover from being raised while the copy is being made. It unlatches and lifts to the open position once the copy had been created. The copy selector then returns to one (to prevent the next user from accidentally making multiple copies). The inability to copy thicker documents was a common sales objection which is only remediated by the IBM Copier II.
- It has three visual signals:
  - Not Ready - which indicates the photoconductor is automatically cycling
  - Call Key Operator - which indicates the photoconductor needs replacement or the emergency off button had been depressed.
  - Add Paper - which indicates the paper roll has run out. The copy cover automatically unlatches when the last copy is printed so the operator can insert a new roll of paper.
- When announced the Copier I was sold for US$19,200 or could be leased from IBM for US$200 a month plus a charge of 2.3 cents for each copy made.

The Copier I also played a role in the development of the IBM 3800, which was IBMs first Laser Printer.

IBM withdrew the Copier I from marketing on June 30, 1981

== IBM Copier II ==
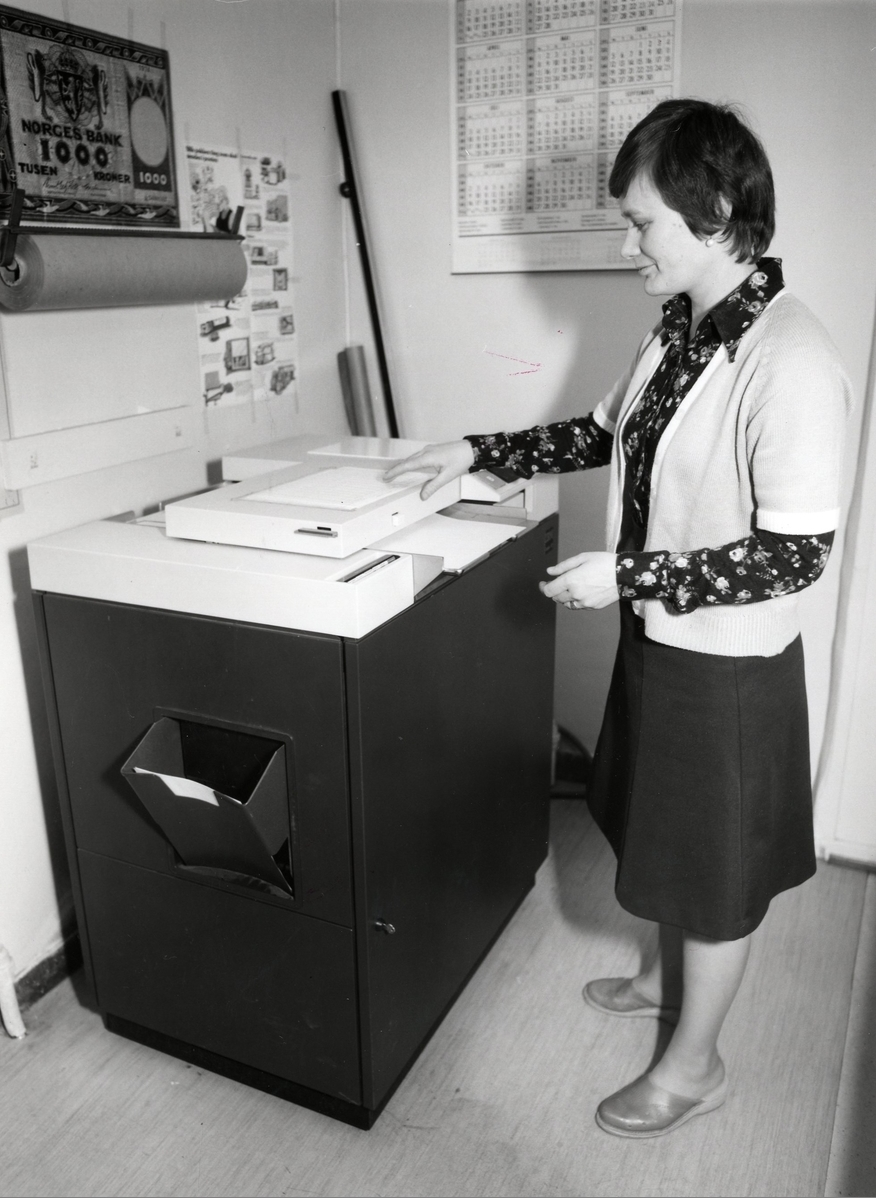
IBM Copier II

The IBM Copier II was introduced in 1972.

- Its IBM Machine type/Model is 6801–001.

By 1977 IBM had sold 70,000 to 80,000 units, claiming 10% of the worldwide market.

The IBM Copier II has the following features:

- It uses a drum based photoconductor rather than a moving platen. IBM claimed it was the first copier to use a stationary document glass and mirror-scanning optics system.
- IBM claimed it was one of the first copiers to employ a magnetic brush, which required a new family of developer mix to be developed.
- The first copy is produced in 6 seconds with subsequent copies every 2.4 seconds. This works out to 25 copies per minute significantly faster than the Copier I.
- It uses a semi automatic document feed, which means the user does not need to lift the lid or align the original document, they can just feed the document into the slot. IBM claimed this was also an industry first and the inventors of the feed, Walter O. Cralle, Jr. and Charles D. Bleau each received a US$20,000 award from IBM for their work. The belt feed they designed aligned and fed the document, allowing faster copies without speeding up the internal copier mechanism.
- Because the platen cover does not need to lock into place, larger original books can be copied. This removes a common sales objection to the Copier I.
- Uses the same paper roll as the Copier I. Each roll can provide approximately 625 letter-size copies. IBM also offered a paper roll that could create 750 letter sized copies. Because it is roll fed it could not do duplex copies.
- The copy selector was changed from 1–10 on the Copier I to 1-20, although unlike the Copier I it does not reset after each job.
- The maximum copy size is 8.5 in × 14 in (220 mm × 360 mm). The minimum copy size is 8 in × 10.5 in (200 mm × 270 mm)
- Is rated to produce 35,000 impressions per month.
- The list price for a Copier II was $15,000.
- In January 1976 a company called Norfin began selling a Collator unit called the DASH-20 that could be easily attached to the Copier II. IBM announced an optional Collator (the IBM 6864) for the Copier II in 1977. It had 10 bins that could each hold 20 sheets of paper.

IBM withdrew the Copier II from marketing on May 6, 1985.

=== Copier Art ===
The American artist and writer named Pati Hill used the IBM Copier II to create artwork sometimes referred to as Xerox Art. In 1977 IBM loaned her a Copier II free of charge for two and a half years which she used to generate artwork for her books and exhibitions.

=== IBM 3896 ===
The Copier II was also sold as the IBM 3896, tape/document converter. The IBM 3896 is used to copy adding machine tapes that were used for bank deposits. The top of the Copier was redesigned to handle these tapes and stack them in the correct order. Note the use of the term tape in the product name has nothing to do with magnetic tape, it refers to paper tapes. The 3896 was announced on April 5, 1977, and was withdrawn on July 25, 1980.

== IBM Series III Copier/Duplicator ==
The IBM Series III was announced March 5, 1976. Unlike the Copier I and Copier II where a whole new design was released within 2–4 years, the Series III was not replaced with a new product, although it did have four major model releases. Development was started in Lexington but moved to Boulder during the summer of 1974. IBM described it as their most ambitious yet, combining the convenience of a copier with the speed of a duplicator making it an everything machine. When comparing to their earlier copiers, Dick Deatrick, IBM's Boulder plant manager, was quoted in IBM Think magazine as saying: “It’s been a standing joke around here that we ‘changed everything but the casters.’ Well, even the casters have been changed."

This was the first IBM copier to use the following:

- Plain cut sheet paper.
- An advanced semi-automatic document feed
- Automatic duplexing
- Collation
- Reduction
- Push button copy selector
- Support for letter head paper

The list price for a Series III was $25,000 to $40,000 depending on features.

At announcement, manufacturing of the copier was in IBM Boulder and IBM Berlin, West Germany.

Eight models were offered over the life of the product across four major releases.

=== Models 10 and 20 ===
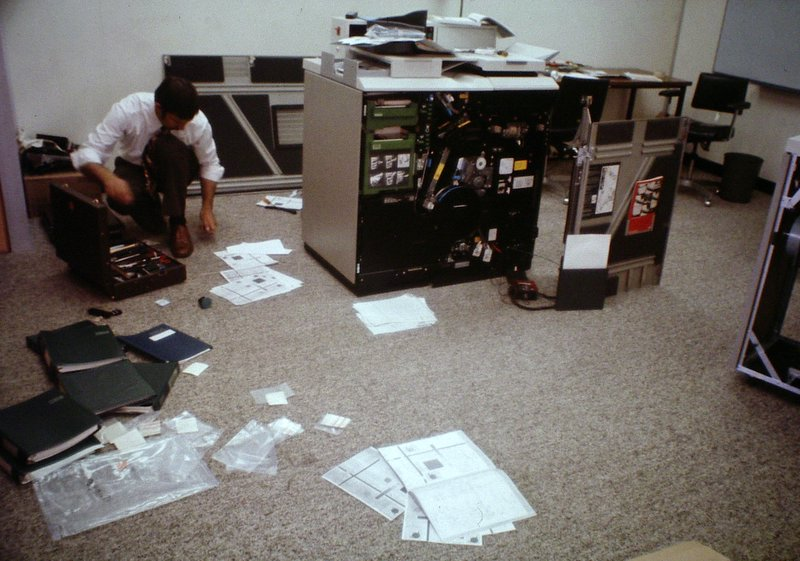
A model 10 receiving an engineering change

The first two models, Models 10 and 20, were announced in 1976 and withdrawn from Marketing on March 11, 1986

- Machine type/Model 6802-001 Series III Copier Model 10.
- Machine type/Model 6803-001 Series III Copier Model 20.
- Collator Machine type/Model 6852-001

Features include:

- Warm up time of 600 seconds. Time to first copy 4.5 seconds.
- Rated speed is 75 pages per minute, 4500 pages per hour
- The primary paper bin holds 2100 sheets while the secondary bin holds 600 sheets of paper.
- The maximum copy size is 8.5 in × 14 in (220 mm × 360 mm). The minimum copy size is 8 in × 10.5 in (200 mm × 270 mm).
- The model 20 offers copy reduction of 65-74%
- One or two optional 20 bin collators. Each bin can hold 100 pages. The second collator is inserted between the copier and the first collator for a total of 40 bins. The first collator provides bins 21-40 and the second collator provides bins 1-20. A flap controlled by a solenoid determines which collator unit a copy is directed into.

Due to extensive reliability problems with paper jams (due to the long and complicated paper path), it was withdrawn in January 1978 and re-released in November 1978 with a considerable number of modifications (which IBM called Engineering Changes or ECs), which meant the momentum gained by the success of the Copier II was lost.

=== Models 30 and 40 ===
The next two models were Models 30 and 40, were announced in 1980 and withdrawn from Marketing on June 16, 1986

- Machine type/Model 6805-001 Series III Copier Model 30.
- Machine type/Model 6806-001 Series III Copier Model 40.

Features included:

- Warm up time of 600 seconds. Time to first copy 4.5 seconds.
- Rated speed is 60 pages per minute, 3600 pages per hour
- The primary paper bin holds 2100 sheets while the secondary bin holds 600 sheets of paper.
- The maximum copy size is 8.5 in × 14 in (220 mm × 360 mm). The minimum copy size is 8 in × 10.5 in (200 mm × 270 mm).
- The model 40 offers copy reduction of 65-74%
- One or two optional 20 bin collators. Each bin can hold 100 pages. The second collator is inserted between the copier and the first collator for a total of 40 bins. The first collator provides bins 21-40 and the second collator provides bins 1-20. A flap controlled by a solenoid determines which collator unit a copy is directed into.

While the Models 30/40 did not suffer from the reliability issues seen with the Models 10/20, IBM admitted they were not commercially successful due to poor price performance caused by high manufacturing costs.

=== Model 60 ===
The next model was the Model 60, announced May 13, 1982 and withdrawn from Marketing on February 3, 1988 The Model 60 was effectively a follow-on product to the Model 40 (in that it offered copy reduction as a standard feature). It uses the same chassis as the model 40 and in fact ex-lease Model 40s were factory rebuilt into Model 60s. The Model 60 offers a more modular way to add or remove features and has a newly designed Semi-Automatic Document Feed (SADF).

- Machine type/Model 6808-001 Series III Copier Model 60.

Features include:

- Warm up time of 600 seconds. Time to first copy 5 seconds.
- Rated speed is 70 pages per minute, 4200 pages per hour
- The primary paper bin holds 2100 sheets while the secondary bin holds 600 sheets of paper.
- The maximum copy size is 8.5 in × 14 in (220 mm × 360 mm). The minimum copy size is 8 in × 10.5 in (200 mm × 270 mm).
- Copy reduction of 65-74%
- Continuous forms feed with an optional automatic stack feeder that can hold 50 pages (a new feature).
- Job interrupt, allowing someone to pause a long running copy job to run a short copy job (a new feature).
- It also offers a two-up feature which can copy two images onto one page (a new feature)
- One of two optional 20 bin collators

IBM ran extensive pre-launch testing on the Model 60, testing at 19 customer sites in New York and Houston for 45 days prior to launch. This resulted in 17 of those clients ordering a total of 105 Model 60s. IBM then launched a major marketing campaign to promote the Model 60 throughout 1983 and 1984.

=== Think Magazine articles ===
IBM dedicated at least two articles of their Think Magazine to the Copier III:

==== From Boulder: the new everything machine (1976) ====
IBM launched the Copier III in an article that emphasised three key points

1. The technical challenges encountered and the innovations that had been added during development of the product.
2. The difficulties encountered moving so many staff to Boulder.
3. The high levels of quality the team has worked to.

==== Comeback (1983) ====
IBM dedicated a large section of the March/April 1983 issue of their staff magazine Think, to the Model 60. They titled the edition and the article: 'Comeback: How Boulder brought new life to the copier business'. They dedicated 12 of the 48 pages to the article, 11 of those being completely filled with text; there were no photographs.

The article had three major themes:

1). A frank acknowledgment of the problems with the models 10/20 and the pricing issues with the models 30/40. They effectively blamed the quality issues on:

- The fact that the model 10/20 design was a quantum leap in complexity
- That the relocation from Lexington to Boulder lost a third of the development team and nearly all of the manufacturing team
- That unlike Lexington which processed 15 million parts a day, Boulder was not set up for volume production of a product with a huge number of parts (up to 15,000 each) and could only handle 100,000 parts per day. Boulder had to learn how to handle 1.2 million parts a day.

2). An assurance that IBM was still committed to producing Copiers and that the quality of the Model 60 was of an exceptional standard.

3). An attempt to frame IBM as an innovator in Copier development with two pages focusing on 'firsts in Copiers'

=== Models 50, 70 and 85 ===
The final release were the Models 50, 70 and 85 announced in 1986. This was a major refresh of the Series III. Models 70 and 85 include a redesigned developer unit with two magnetic brush rolls instead of one, which IBM claimed provided enhanced character fill, increased optical density and excellent copy quality in comparison to previous models. You will note the model 50 was announced four years after the model 60, this is not a mistake.

- Machine type/Model 6809-001 Series III Copier/Duplicator Model 50. This uses collators 6852-004 (primary 20 bins) and 6852-003 (secondary 20 bins).
- Machine type/Model 8880-001 Series III Copier/Duplicator Model 70. This uses collators 8881-001 (primary 20 bins) and 8881-002 (secondary 20 bins).
- Machine type/Model 8885-001 Series III Copier/Duplicator Model 85. Collators are standard with the Model 85, so there are no separate machine types.

All three copiers have a primary drawer that holds 2100 sheets of paper and a secondary drawer that holds 600 sheets of paper. All three use the same toner: IBM part number 1669070.

The models 70 and 85 also offer higher-rated copies per month as per the table below:

	Copies per minute	Copies per hour	Copies per month	Copier Weight	Copier Dimensions
Series III Model 50	55	3300	30,000	545 kg (1,202 lb)	47.25 in × 49.0 in × 29.5 in (120.0 cm × 124.5 cm × 74.9 cm)
Series III Model 70	70	4200	175,000	545 kg (1,202 lb)	49.0 in × 51.25 in × 29.5 in (124.5 cm × 130.2 cm × 74.9 cm)
Series III Model 85	70	4200	175,000	658 kg (1,451 lb)	75.25 in × 51.25 in × 29.5 in (191.1 cm × 130.2 cm × 74.9 cm)

The model 85 also introduces three new features not seen before on an IBM Copier:

- Fully automated duplex copies. The operator no longer needs to turn over the page to copy the second side
- An optional stapler unit
- An interactive display screen with 140 different message screens that could display in 13 languages

IBM withdrew the Series III models 50, 70 and 85 from IBM Marketing on June 28, 1988, when they transferred the product line to Kodak.

=== IBM 6670 ===
The Series III was used as part of the IBM 6670. The IBM 6670 and its Collator unit (the IBM 6671) were introduced in 1979 and withdrawn from marketing on November 19, 1986.

== IBM Executive Copier 102 ==
In February 1981, IBM announced it would resell the Minolta compact desktop EP-310 as the IBM Executive Copier 102, machine type model 6820–001. It is capable of making 12 copies a minute, and sold for $2,990 to $3,450 depending on the quantity purchased. IBM had never offered a desktop Copier before, but found they could not compete with Minolta's own dealers and sales people who were able to undercut IBMs pricing with the Minolta branded version of the same copier. This was because IBMs agreement with Minolta was not exclusive.

The IBM Executive Copier 102 was withdrawn from marketing on December 30, 1982, after less than two years in the market.

== IBM 6821 Copier Management Information System (CMIS) ==
On July 17, 1984, IBM announced the 6821 Copier Management Information System (CMIS). The solution consists of software that ran on an IBM 5150 Personal Computer with 128MB of RAM and two double sided floppy disk drives, running DOS 1.1. It uses special cable adapters to connect to up to 20 IBM Copiers and later, selected Kodak and Xerox copiers. The system is used to centrally collect usage statistics, since copier billing (for rental or maintenance charges) was usually on a per-copy usage basis. It was withdrawn on April 20, 1987.

== Manufacturing plants ==
IBM initially developed and manufactured their copier products in Lexington, Kentucky. This changed in April 1973 when IBM Office Product Division assumed responsibility for the IBM Boulder site. Given the space required in Lexington to handle the demand for the Lexington manufactured self-correcting Selectric II typewriter, OPD announced that copier development and manufacturing would move to the IBM Boulder plant. This only changed when in April 1986, IBM announced they were launching a US$120 million remissioning project that would result in the end of manufacturing at the Boulder site, focusing it instead on software and services. Thus in 1987 copier manufacturing (which by then only consisted of the Series III) was moved from Boulder, Colorado to Charlotte, North Carolina, although development remained in Boulder.

IBM Germany also manufactured copiers in Berlin starting in 1970. In 1974 production moved to a new 50-acre site at Marienfelde in Berlin, that built copiers, dictation machines and typewriters.

== Organic photoconductor and TNF ==
The original photoconductor used by the IBM Copier I and Copier II (and later by the IBM 3800) used a chemical known as 2, 4, 7-trinitro-9-fluorenone, commonly referred to as TNF. The photoconductor was mainly composed of a TNF and polyvinyl carbazole resin coating on an aluminized mylar sheet and was manufactured by IBM in Lexington, Kentucky. Over the course of the 1970s, health and safety concerns were raised about TNF being a cancer-causing chemical. The US Federal Department of Health and Human Services contracted the National Institute for Occupational Safety and Health to investigate these concerns but their report did not identify any issues. Despite this, in 1980 IBM changed its advice and required its employees to always handle the photoconductor with gloves. IBM then withdrew TNF based photoconductors in late 1981 for the Copier II and IBM 3800, replacing it with a photoconductor based on chlorotiane blue and diethylaminobenzal- denyde-dithenylhydrazone (sometimes called blue coral). This material was already being used in the IBM Series III and IBM 6670 and was manufactured by IBM in Boulder Colorado.

== The end of OPD and withdrawal from the copier market ==
The IBM Office Products Division was formed from the IBM Electric Typewriter Division in August 1964. It marketed products such as the Selectric Typewriter, the MagCard Selectric Typewriter, the Magnetic Tape Selectric Composer, Dictation Equipment and the IBM Copier Family until 1981, when it was merged with the data processing and general systems divisions into two new divisions: National Accounts and National Marketing. This was reportedly done to prevent the client from needing to deal with multiple sales representatives. The Boulder and Lexington plant/lab sites became part of the new Information Products Division.

The IBM line of Copier/Duplicators, and their associated service contracts, were sold to Eastman Kodak in 1988. At the time of sale it was reported there were approximately 61,500 IBM copiers still in service. IBM indicated that the models 50, 70 and 85 of the Series III would be manufactured by IBM in Charlotte and sold by Kodak with the Kodak logo. It is unclear how many IBM manufactured copiers Kodak sold, however by 1996 Kodak also announced they were also withdrawing from copier marketing, selling their copier sales and service division to Danka for $684m USD, while still manufacturing them. Danka was then eventually bought by Konica Minolta in 2008.
