= Open Document Architecture =

Free and open international standard document file format

- Internet media type: application/ODA
- Developed by: ITU-T, ISO/IEC
- Initial release: 1989; 37 years ago
- Type of format: Document file format
- Standard: CCITT T.411-T.424, ISO 8613
- Website: ISO/IEC 8613

The Open Document Architecture (ODA) and interchange format (informally referred to as just ODA) is a free and open international standard document file format maintained by the ITU-T to replace all proprietary document file formats. ODA is detailed in the standards documents CCITT T.411-T.424, which is equivalent to ISO/IEC 8613.

== Format ==
ODA defines a compound document format that can contain raw text, raster images and vector graphics. In the original release the difference between this standard and others like it is that the graphics structures were exclusively defined as CCITT raster image and Computer Graphics Metafile (CGM - ISO/IEC 8632). This was to limit the problem of having word processor and desktop publisher software be required to interpret all known graphics formats.

The documents have both logical and layout structures. Logically the text can be partitioned into chapters, footnotes and other subelements akin to HTML, and the layout fill a function similar to Cascading Style Sheets in the web world. The binary transport format for an ODA-conformant file is called Open Document Interchange Format (ODIF) and is based on the Standard Generalized Markup Language and Abstract Syntax Notation One (ASN.1).

One of the features of this standard could be stored or interchanged in one of three formats: Formatted, Formatted Processable, or Processable. The latter two are editable formats. The first is an uneditable format that is logically similar to Adobe Systems PDF that is in common use today.

== History ==
In 1985, ESPRIT financed a pilot implementation of the ODA concept, involving companies such as Bull, Olivetti, ICL, and Siemens.

The goal was to create a universal, storable, and interchangeable document structure that would remain usable over time and compatible with any word processor or desktop publisher. During the late 1970s and early 1980s, the rapid spread of personal computers and the ease of developing software for early PCs led to numerous word processing applications competing for market dominance. Meanwhile, corporations transitioning from dedicated word processors to PCs faced a proliferation of proprietary file formats.

By 1985, it was evident that this fragmentation would worsen, especially with the advent of desktop publishing and multimedia computing. ODA aimed to address the problem of software developers frequently changing native file formats to add new features, often breaking backward compatibility. Older native formats were repeatedly becoming obsolete and therefore unusable after only a few years. This led to a large financial impact on companies that were using ad hoc standard applications, such as Microsoft Word or WordPerfect, because their IT departments had to constantly assist frustrated users with transferring content between so many different formats, and also hire employees whose sole job was to import old stored documents into the latest version of applications before they became unreadable. The intended result of the ODA standard was that companies would not have to commit to an ad hoc standard for word processor or desktop publisher applications, because any application adhering to a common open standard could be used to read and edit long stored documents.

The initial round of documents that made up ISO 8613 was completed after a multi-year effort at an ISO/IEC JTC1/SC18/WG3 meeting in Paris La Defense, France, around Armistice (Nov. 11) 1987, called "Office Document Architecture" at the time. CCITT picked them up as the T.400 series of recommendations, using the term "Open Document Architecture". Work continued on additional parts for a while, for instance at an ISO working group meeting in Ottawa in February 1989. Improvements and additions were continually being made. The revised standard was finally published in 1999. However, no significant developer of document application software chose to support the format, probably because the conversion from the existing dominant word processor formats such as WordPerfect and Microsoft Word was difficult, offered little fidelity, and would only have weakened their advantage of vendor lock-in over their existing user base. There were also cultural obstacles because ODA was a predominantly European project that took a top-down design approach. It was unable to garner significant interest from the American software developer community or trade press. Finally, it took an extraordinarily long time to release the ODA format (the pilot was financed in 1985, but the final specification not published until 1999). Given a lack of products that supported the format, in part because of the excessive time used to create the specification, few users were interested in using it. Eventually interest in the format faded.

IBM's European Networking Center (ENC) in Heidelberg, Germany, developed prototype extensions to IBM OfficeVision/VM to support ODA, in particular a converter between ODA and Document Content Architecture (DCA) document formats.

It would be improper to call ODA anything but a failure, but its spirit clearly influenced latter-day document formats that were successful in gaining support from many document software developers and users. These include the already-mentioned HTML and CSS as well as XML and XSL leading up to OpenDocument and Office Open XML.

== See also ==
- Raster Document Object – a file format by Xerox based on ODA
