= IBM DPPX =

Distributed Processing Programming Executive (DPPX)
- Developer: IBM
- Written in: PL/DS
- Working state: Discontinued
- Initial release: 1978; 48 years ago
- Latest release: DPPX/370 / 1988; 38 years ago
- Supported platforms: IBM 8100, ES/9370
- Default user interface: Command-line interface
- License: Proprietary

Distributed Processing Programming Executive is a discontinued operating system introduced by IBM, pre-installed on the IBM 8100 and later ported to the ES/9370.

== Brief history ==
- It was first introduced on the IBM 8100 series, which was released in 1978.
- 1987 saw the release of Distributed Processing Programming Executive System Product (DPPX/SP) Release 4.
- In 1986, IBM decided to cease the IBM 8100 architecture to consolidate its hardware and software families.
- In 1988, they released DPPX/370 which ran on the ES/9370 processors (an S/370 model).
- By the end of June 1997, DPPX/370 was officially retired.

== Architecture ==
DPPX was written in Programming Language for Distributed Systems (PL/DS), a PL/I-derived systems programming language, similar to the PL/S systems programming language used for MVS and VM. Part of the DPPX/370 development process was developing a PL/DS 2 language, which was based on PL/DS, but with changes necessitated by the changed instruction set. (PL/DS, like PL/S, is a high-level language which encourages significant use of inline assembly.)

DDPX's command-line interface and documentation were described by IBM as consistent and well-organized, with online help and comprehensive set of printed manuals. A DPPX system was designed to be operable without a dedicated on-site operator, running remotely, reflecting the "Distributed" part of its name. This design allowed programs to be written in modern dialects of COBOL, with dialogs developed interactively. Despite this, the IBM 8100 platform that hosted DPPX achieved limited commercial success and drew criticism from contemporary reviewers and users. PC Magazine reportedly described the 8100 as a "boat anchor," and a 1980s trade press report noted dissatisfaction among UK users over data management difficulties.

DPPX had a native DBMS with simple key-lookup architecture, and ability to move forward through a table after starting from a specific key value by issuing a read-forward command. A limitation of the DPPX DBMS was the lack of read-previous capability, which made it difficult, for example, to code page-back functionality for a screen loaded from a DPPX DBMS table. This limitation was mitigated by an enterprising young programmer (K. Riley of Anchorage, Alaska) who suggested at the application layer creating alternate keys for the DPPX tables that needed read-previous functionality. The alternate keys could then be loaded with the binary 1's complement of the primary key, at which point reading forward on the alternate key was equivalent to reading previous on the primary key.

== Software ==
In addition to the expected functions of an operating system, DPPX included several functions which allowed for remote administration, such as Distributed Host Command Facility (DHCF), which allowed a Host Command Facility (HCF) user on a mainframe to log on in either full-screen mode or line mode to execute commands as though logged on locally, and Distributed Systems Network (or Node) Executive (DSNX), which allowed a Distributed Systems Executive (DSX) (later NetView/DM) job to manage files.

Separate additional products were also available, including COBOL and Fortran compilers, the Distributed Transaction Management System (DTMS), Command Facilities Extensions (CFE), which provided easy support for full-screen applications, Data Stream Capability (DSC) to allow DPPX users to log on to applications on the mainframe, and Performance Tool (PT).
