= IBM DisplayWrite =

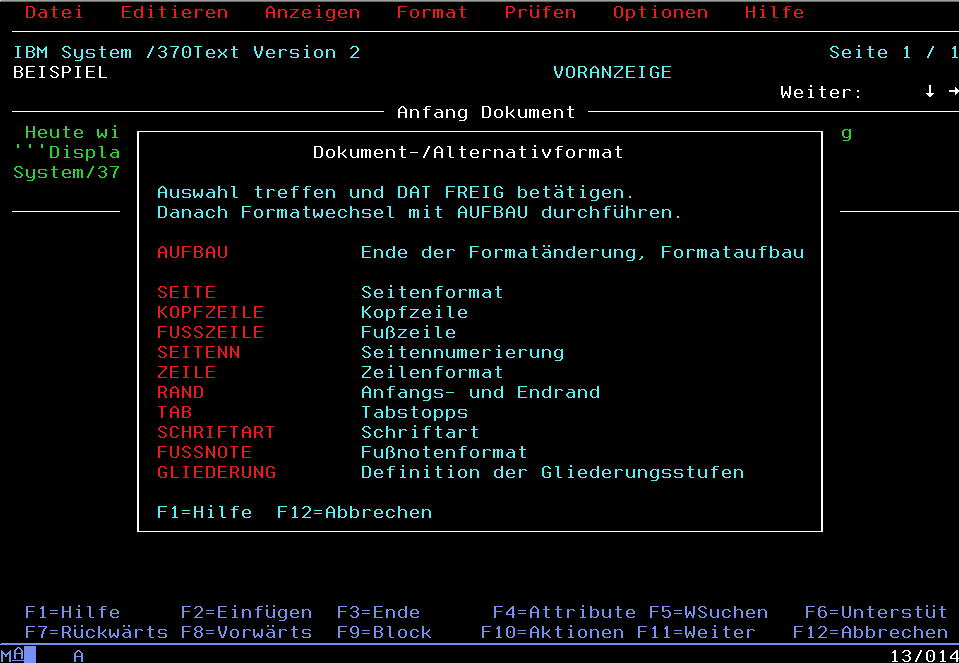
- IBM DisplayWrite/370 (German)
- Release: 1981; 45 years ago
- Operating system: PC DOS/MS-DOS, MVS-CICS, VM/CMS, OS/400
- Type: Word processor
- License: commercial

DisplayWrite (sometimes written as Displaywrite) is a discontinued word processor program that IBM developed and marketed for the IBM PC and PCjr. It was among the company's first internally developed, commercially sold PC software titles.

DisplayWrite's feature set was based on the IBM Displaywriter System, a dedicated microcomputer-based word processing machine. Because the two systems were so similar, an experienced Displaywriter user could start using DisplayWrite immediately.

== Versions ==
=== DisplayWrite/PC ===
For the Intel platform there were DisplayWrite versions for PC/MS-DOS and DisplayWrite 5/2 programmed under OS/2.

=== DisplayWrite/36 ===
DisplayWrite/36 was the word processing component of IBM Office/36, which allowed an office to use the SQL-based database file for labels and form letters.

=== DisplayWrite/370 ===
DisplayWrite/370, a much more powerful version with full graphics and WYSIWYG support, was supported for IBM zSeries mainframe computers until May 2015. (see IBM Displaywriter System). DW/370 was a host-based word processor. It was marketed between 1993 and 2015 for MVS/CICS (now z/OS) and VM/CMS.

== File format ==
IBM DisplayWrite's native file format is based on IBM's DCA (Document Content Architecture) RFT (Revisable Form Text) specification, but adds additional structures. Depending on the DisplayWrite version, the document files use .DOC or .TXT file name extension. The DisplayWrite software can export to and import from pure DCA/RFT files (which typically have .DCA or .RFT file name extension). RFT (IBM Revisable Form Text) should not be confused with RTF (Rich Text Format), which is a Microsoft specification.

== Reception ==
As of 1987 DisplayWrite was the only successful IBM software product for the PC. A 1988 PC reader survey found that 6% used DisplayWrite 4, tied for fifth with PC-Write among word processors. A 1990 American Institute of Certified Public Accountants member survey found that 2% of respondents used DisplayWrite as their word processor.

PC Magazine found DisplayWrite 1 and pfs:Write the best of six inexpensive word processors it reviewed in 1985. The magazine said that the IBM product was the most powerful and the "obvious choice for a large office staff". Describing DisplayWrite 3 in 1987 as "a tank — big, powerful, clumsy, ugly, and hard to use"—John V. Lombardi said in InfoWorld that DisplayWrite 4 was more powerful and improved the user interface "but performance remains much the same". Noting that WordPerfect was the same price with "more features, better performance, and much better support" for retail customers, he only recommended DisplayWrite to companies needing compatibility with other IBM word processors. PC in 1988 said that while DisplayWrite still sold well to "businesses where the pixie dust falling from the letters I-B-M is just irresistible" it "remains highly resistible", citing DisplayWrite 4's 1970s user interface and continuing "amazing hostility to the world of non-IBM printers".
