= IBM 8100 =

IBM 8100 Information System

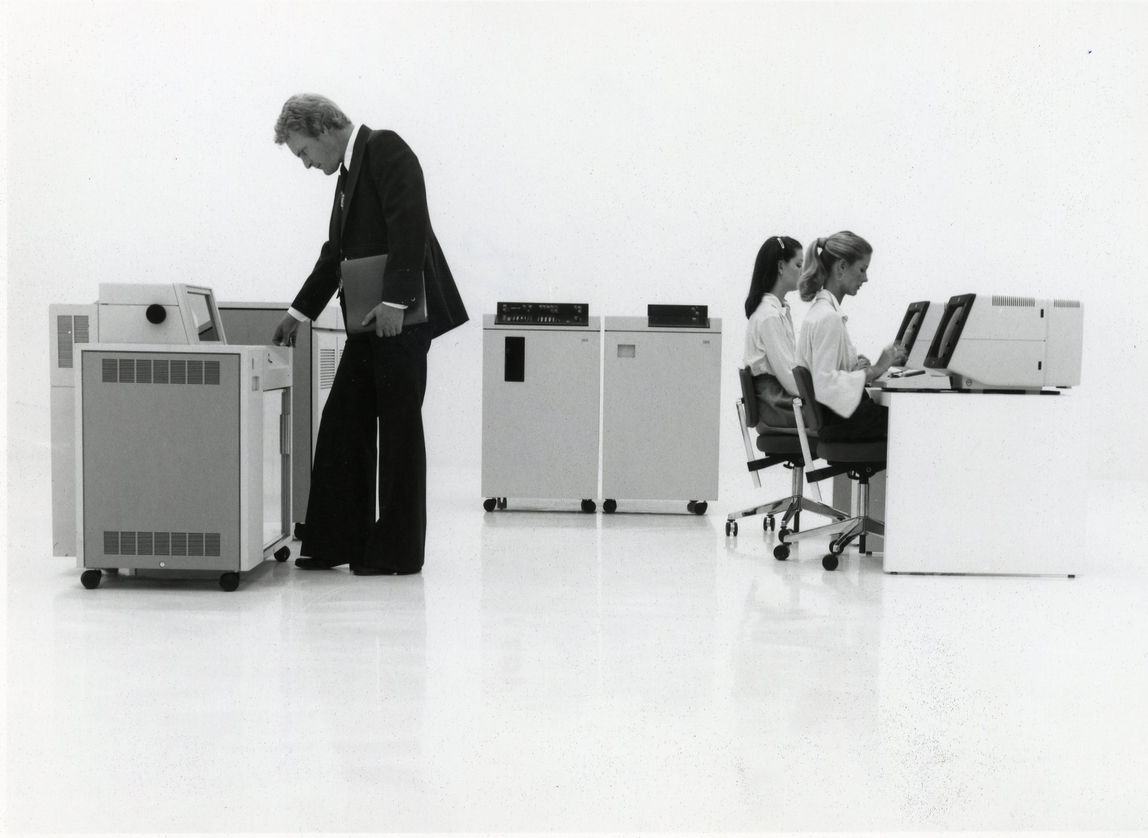
- IBM 8100 distributed system; IBM 8775 terminals on the right, 81#0 processor in the center
- Released: 1978; 48 years ago
- Predecessor: IBM 3790

The IBM 8100 Information System, announced Oct. 3, 1978, was at one time IBM’s principal distributed processing engine, providing local processing capability under two incompatible operating systems (DPPX and DPCX) and was a follow-on to the IBM 3790.

The 8100, when used with the Distributed Processing Programming Executive (DPPX), was intended to provide turnkey distributed processing capabilities in a centrally controlled and managed network.

It never saw much success—one anonymous source, according to PC Magazine, called it a "boat anchor"—and became moribund when host-based networks went out of fashion. This, coupled with IBM's recognition that they had too many hardware and software systems with similar processing power and function, led to announcement in March 1986 that the 8100 line would not be expanded and a new System/370 compatible processor line, ES/9370, would be provided to replace it. In March 1987, IBM announced that it intended to provide in 1989 a version of DPPX/SP that would run on the new ES/9370. A formal announcement followed in March 1988 of DPPX/370, a version of DPPX that executed on the ES/9370 family of processors. DPPX/370 was made available to customers in December 1988.

DPCX (Distributed Processing Control eXecutive) was mainly to support a word processing system, Distributed Office Support Facility (DOSF).

== Architecture ==
The 8100 was a 32-bit processor, but its instruction set reveals its lineage as the culmination of a line of so-called Universal Controller processors internally designated UC0 (8-bit), UC.5 (16-bit) and UC1 (32-bit). Each processor carried along the instruction set and architecture of the smaller processors, allowing programs written for a smaller processor to run on a larger one without change.

The 8100 had another interesting distinction in being one of the first commercially available systems to have a network with characteristics of what we now call local area networks, in particular the mechanism of packet passing. It was called the "8100 Loop" or "R-Loop" and it supported various attached terminals (such as the 3104), printers (such as the free-standing 3268-1) and other devices. Topologically this arranged terminals in a ring, with redundant sets of wires which allowed for a break in the wire to be tolerated simply by "turning back" the data on each side of the break.

The 8100 also supported an "intelligent" terminal called the 8775 (which shared the same case as the 3279 colour display terminal for IBM's mainframes and, like the 3279 was designed at IBM's UK Development Lab at Hursley Park, England) which was the first to ship with the ability to download its functionality from the host computer to which it was attached.

== Product range ==
- 8130 (various models) - Processor unit
- 8140 (various models) - Processor unit
- 8150 (various models) - Processor unit
- 8101 - External disk unit
- 8809 - External tape unit

What was notable about the machines was that they were designed to be "office-friendly", not requiring special power supplies or cooling systems, and running quietly. Their size also made them attractive in this environment.

== Post mortem ==
In 1983, Computer Automation, Inc. offered a trade-in program for IBM 8100 users, in exchange for a CA-Syfa system. The offer was to accommodate those who purchased "two or three" 8100s for program development, and encountered too many obstacles.
