= IBM Displaywriter System =

1980 office desktop computer

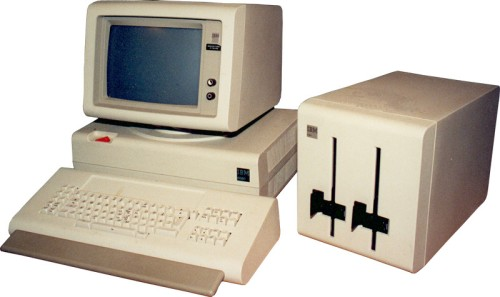
- IBM Displaywriter with keyboard, monitor and dual 8-inch floppy disk drive “toaster”
- Developer: IBM
- Manufacturer: IBM
- Type: Microcomputer
- Released: June 1980
- Introductory price: US$7,895 (equivalent to $30,800 in 2025); Leased for US$275 (equivalent to $1,070 in 2025) a month
- Operating system: Textpack, MS-DOS, CP/M-86, UCSD p-System
- CPU: Intel 8086 @ 5 MHz
- Memory: 128 KB – 448 KB
- Display: 25-line (640x400); 66-line (800x1056)
- Related: IBM System/23 Datamaster IBM Office System/6 IBM 5280 Distributed Data System IBM Personal Computer

The IBM 6580 Displaywriter System is a 16-bit microcomputer that was marketed and sold by IBM's Office Products Division from June 17, 1980 until July 2, 1986, primarily as a word processor. The system was configured with an Intel 8086 clocked at 5 MHz, 128 KB to 448 KB of RAM, a monochrome CRT monitor, a detached keyboard, a detached 8" floppy disk drive enclosure with one or two drives, and a detached daisy wheel printer, or Selectric typewriter printer.

Optional add-on cards and software give the Displaywriter the ability to connect to a modem, read Selectric Mag-Cards, create a resource-sharing LAN with other Displaywriters or IBM PCs to share printing and fixed disk storage capabilities, or emulate a 3270 or 3101 terminal. The Displaywriter primarily competed with other contemporaneous word processors, but demand from IBM’s customer base led several third-party OEMs to port general-purpose operating systems and software to the Displaywriter. IBM intended the Displaywriter to run its own internally developed special-purpose operating system titled "Textpack", but UCSD p-System, CP/M-86, and MS-DOS were also offered by Softech Microsystems (through a licensing agreement with IBM), Digital Research, and CompuSystems, respectively.

== Development, Market Positioning & Design Theory ==
The direct predecessor of the Displaywriter, the Office System/6, did not sell well. Though the OS/6 was brought to market in 1977, it was quickly out-competed by cheaper, smaller, and more capable dedicated word processors. The screen of the Office System/6 was small compared to other word processors of the time at only 6 lines of user text, and the features, while promising sounding on paper, were limited. Indirectly, between 1975 and 1979, IBM’s percentage of new market share in the word processing market fell from 83% of new machines sold to 53% of new machines sold. In 1978 and 1979 IBM's Office Products Division (OPD) began developing a replacement product line that would correct the issues of the OS/6 and help regain market share. The resulting system that ended up becoming the Displaywriter was built around the ideas of presenting the customer with feature and pricing flexibility and keeping costs low compared to previous OPD systems.

Hardware and software was broken up into modular tiers and features that an OPD sales rep would select for a customer based on their needs. Physical features and functions of the Displaywriter were broken up into discrete cards which connected to passive backplanes housed inside the electronics unit and disk unit. In addition to customer customization, this was also done to increase the turnaround speed of upgrades and repairs for IBM’s field service personnel and reduce engineering overhead when designing new feature cards. The Displaywriter electronics unit was designed around being assembled by industrial robotic systems and the assembly plant that made the Displaywriter electronics units in Austin was fully automated, one of IBMs first plants to be so as the pilot program for what ended up becoming IBM’s Automated Logistics and Production System (ALPS) that assembled the PC line and some dashboard components for the Ford Ranger.

IBM’s marketing literature positioned the Displaywriter as being uniquely useful for those who wrote legal, accounting, engineering, and educational documents with advertisements emphasizing the size of the electronic dictionary, “keying finished documents at rough draft speeds”, forms that could be created and filled with accounting data, and the graphs and charts that could be created and merged into existing documents. By 1982 the Displaywriter came bundled with a large amount of user-friendly documentation (usually 15 binders) which was aimed at helping first time users understand the functions of the menu-driven software, Textpack, which is a special-purpose operating system that was intended to be the primary means of interacting with the Displaywriter. In 1982 IBM and Softech Microsystems entered into an agreement to port UCSD p-System to the Displaywriter, at which point IBM licensed and ported a few existing pieces of p-System software for the Displaywriter and began advertising the Displaywriter as being data-processing capable.

== Software & Operating Systems ==
=== Textpack ===
Textpack is a proprietary word processing suite developed by IBM specifically for the Displaywriter that was meant to facilitate and expedite document creation, pagination and finalization. Though Textpack bootstraps the system and is capable of limited multi-tasking, it is not a general purpose operating system like DOS or CP/M. Instead, it IPLs directly to a menu of text editing and pagination functions, with additional options to manage Textpack data disks or load one of several IBM supplemental programs, called "Feature Programs". Textpack was offered in six versions, titled: "E", "1", "2", "3", "4", & "6". These versions of Textpack were tiered in functionality, with only basic text editing being offered with the lowest Textpack versions, E and 1. More advanced features, such as customizing keyboard macros and menu shortcuts, automatically generating custom headers and footers, automatically processing math equations, or emulating a 3101 or 3270 terminal, were reserved for Textpack 4 or Textpack 6. If the Displaywriter system possesses enough RAM, and is running Textpack 4 or 6, it can also load a Feature Program concurrently with a document, and tab between editing the document and the Feature Program in real time.

Diskettes used within Textpack are always formatted as either 284 kB capacity if the disk is 1D, or 985 kB capacity if the disk is 2D, regardless of a disk's actual advertised capacity. This is a software limitation of Textpack, and not a hardware limitation of the Displaywriter floppy disk controller. Because there is no user accessible setting to designate disk sector size within Textpack, the operating system arbitrarily assumes that all 1D disks are rated as SS SD (single-sided, single-density) with 256B sectors and that all 2D disks are rated as DS DD (double-sided, double-density) with 256B sectors, which results in the aforementioned capacities. Textpacks 4 and 6 also offered the ability to combine all program disks into a single DS DD floppy, which could then also be used for document storage if space remained on the disk. The format that Textpack diskettes utilized, though similar to the IBM 3740 Data Entry System, and the Office System/6 was not interchangeable. 3740 and OS/6 disks cannot be read by a Displaywriter and vice versa. Records can instead be exchanged via communication features. Text created in Textpack is encoded with 8-bit EBCDIC. The Displaywriter also supports ASCII, but 8-bit EBCDIC is used in this context in order to take advantage of the 256 characters available per EBCDIC font set, compared to the maximum of 128 characters available per ASCII font set. The Displaywriter uses two of these EBCDIC 256 character font sets, which are stored in ROM on the display adapter card in order to achieve a total of 512 possible available characters. When instructed, the Displaywriter draws from these font sets to generate a working character table in RAM for the operating system to use. Only 256 of the available 512 characters can be used concurrently by the user, but characters from either character set can be mixed and matched to total up to 256 and characters can be hot swapped to in software. This can be done by using the "keyboard change" button on the keyboard. The ASCII code set is accessible within Textpack while using the Asynchronous or Bisynchronous communication features, where the Displaywriter converts characters stored as EBCDIC on the disk into ASCII before transmitting and vice versa after receiving ta transmission. Additionally, if the user wishes to type in ASCII directly during a communication session, they can change the keyboard to keyboard #103 which is the standard ASCII keyboard. While in ASCII mode the Displaywriter can generate all printable ASCII characters. ASCII control characters can be accessed at any time, even in EBCDIC mode, by depressing the control key (the blank key above REQST on the keyboard), and then pressing a corresponding key in the alphanumeric block. Because they are command characters, they do not have associated visuals and don't add to the 256 displayable character total. IBM used the six character disk labels of the program disks to determine whether one disk was compatible with another. If a disk label of a noncompatible program diskette is changed to a label associated with a compatible diskette, the Displaywriter will attempt to execute the disk as if it contained the correct software, but certain features will either not function properly, or Textpack will present a halt code.

=== UCSD p-System ===
UCSD p-System was the official "data processing" operating system for the Displaywriter, offered by IBM through contract with Softech Microsystems. Announced in September 1982 and made available in December 1982, as part of the contract, p-System was extensively supported by Softech Microsystems, and had multiple feature upgrades offered from IBM as time went on.

When purchasing UCSD p-System for Displaywriter, the purchaser could choose between p-System Runtime, or p-System "Development System", which was the same as Runtime, but was bundled with a BASIC compiler or an additional Fortran-77, 8086 Assembly code, or PASCAL compiler.

IBM and Softech Microsystems also sold a software upgrade that would provide p-System with the appropriate I/O calls for the RS-232 port(s) on the Displaywriter's communications card, as well as a conversion utility, titled "B&H Exchange Utility", to convert UCSD format files to "B&H" format files, which is the file structure used on the System/23 Datamaster, System/36 and System/38. p-System did not ship many units for the Displaywriter, but was notably used by the USDA Rural Development as the operating system for the "Farmer Program Servicing Action System", which was a custom software suite written by the Rural Development agency.

Additional programs offered by IBM for Displaywriter p-System included: "Financial Planning and Report Generating System", which was an advanced version of Reportpack that included financial modeling and easier report generation, "QUICKSTART Utility", which decreased load time of large programs, and "Money-Track" financial tracking by Pacific Data Systems.

=== CP/M-86 ===
Digital Research announced CP/M-86 v1.1 with BDOS 2.2 for the Displaywriter in November 1981, with orders starting to ship in Q1 1982. The release contains custom I/O calls and printer configuration menus for the Displaywriter's proprietary hardware. It is mostly functionally equivalent to other CP/M-86 v1.1 implementations, but with the caveat that the limitations of the Displaywriter disk subsystem and graphics card prevent HDD support or raster/vector graphics support from being possible. That said, most CP/M-86 software is compatible since most CP/M software is glyph based. Due to the wide variety of hardware architectures that ran CP/M, most CP/M-86 software has a keyboard and CRT control code configuration menu, where the appropriate information can be entered for the Displaywriter. CP/M-86 was originally meant to be released under contract, similar to UCSD p-System, but this fell through, and the operating system was instead offered independently by Digital Research. Reflective of the failed agreement, the independent product revisions were classified as "Maintenance Levels" which is an IBM internal term denoting software revisions, and is not a term used in other Digital Research products. While the internal data stream of the Displaywriter is EBCDIC, the Displaywriter ROS contains an ASCII character translation table which is leveraged in the Textpack software. This functionality was also used to run CP/M-86 in ASCII mode. The prerelease version of CP/M-86 had a manually mapped keyboard, but the production release utilized the keyboard IDs produced by the Displaywriter keyboard controller and was capable of switching between keyboard layouts within the setup menu. CCP/M-86 with BDOS 3.1 for Displaywriter also began development in Q4 1981 but was never offered as an official product. Only a prerelease build is available today.

=== MS-DOS ===
MS-DOS version 1.25 was offered independently by CompuSystems of South Carolina. The "MS-DOS Loader" written by CompuSystems ignores the Displaywriter's ROM BAT results and does its own hardware assessment when bootstrapping the operating system. Due to the nature of MS-DOS version 1.25 and the Displaywriter hardware, the scope of applications that can be run is limited. The release is otherwise similar to MS-DOS 1.25 OEMs done for other systems of the era. Limited printer support is included through Ctrl-P but DOS assumes that the printer is a tractor-fed 5218 and there is no utility to change this default.

=== IBM List of Official Software Offerings ===
Complete List Of IBM Software Offerings
5608-AX1	Displaywriter Administrative Support	Premade templates for Textpack that would aid in administrative reporting.
5608-AX2	Displaywriter Applicant Processing	Premade templates for Textpack that would aid in applicant processing.
5608-AX3	Displaywriter Personnel Reporting	Premade templates for Textpack that would aid in administrative personnel reporting.
5608-SR1	Displaywriter Asynchronous Communications	Asynchronous communications program application for Textpack. Able to send and receive ASCII data.
5608-SR2	Displaywriter Binary Synchronous Communications	Binary synchronous communications program application for Textpack.
5608-SR3	Displaywriter Magnetic Card Conversion	Converts documents written on IBM MagCards into Displaywriter EBCDIC format and saves them to a floppy disk. Uses the 6361 card reader.
5608-SR4	Displaywriter Languagepack	Intended for use with Textpack 2 and 3. Provides spell checking in 11 languages: US English, UK English, National French, French-Canadian, Dutch, Spanish, Italian, German, Swedish, Danish, & Norwegian; and allowed creation of supplemental dictionaries for each language.
5608-SR5	Displaywriter Reportpack	Creates and manages lists of data using user-designed database entry templates. Templates which were also sold by IBM are included on this list.
5608-SR6	Displaywriter Data Stream Compatibility	3270 data stream enhancement. Emulates a 3274 control unit. Requires the 3270 adapter card PRPQ.
5608-SR7	Displaywriter Languagepack 2	Intended for use with Textpack 4 and 6. Provides spell checking in 11 languages: US English, UK English, National French, French-Canadian, Dutch, Spanish, Italian, German, Swedish, Danish, & Norwegian; and allowed creation of supplemental dictionaries for each language. Includes support for the enhanced spell check features in Textpack 4 and 6.
5608-SR8	Electronic Document Distribution - 6580 Displaywriter	Shares Displaywriter documents with a S/370 mainframe running the DISOSS/370 application: Distributed Office Support Version 3.
5608-SR9	3270 Attached Workstation - 6580 Displaywriter	Allows the Displaywriter to emulate a 3278 terminal. Requires the 3270 adapter card PRPQ.
5608-SRA	Chartpack - 6580 Displaywriter	Creates character-based charts that could be inserted into typed documents. Came with a unique print wheel to support the new characters.
5608-SRB	Extended Spelling Dictionary - Legal - 6580	Provides spell checking for United States legal terminology. Premade supplemental dictionary.
5608-TR1	Displaywriter Textpack 1	
5608-TR2	Displaywriter Textpack 2	
5608-TR3	Displaywriter Textpack 3	
5608-TR4	Displaywriter Textpack 4	
5608-TR6	Displaywriter Textpack 6	
5608-TRE	Displaywriter Textpack E	
5792-ZFB	6580 Money-Track Demonstration	
5796-PXC	6580 Hotel/lodging Application	
5796-PXD	6580 Medical Fund Raising	
5796-PXE	Displaywriter Medical Record	
5796-ZDA	LogiCalc for Displaywriter	
5796-ZDB	LogiQuest III for Displaywriter	
5796-ZFB	6580 Money-Track	
5796-ZHR	Displaywriter Information System for Attorneys	
5798-RNG	Displaywriter Legal Billing	
5798-RNW	General Donor Fund Raising - Displaywriter	
5798-RNX	Displaywriter Association Management	
5798-RNY	Educational Fund Raising - 6580 Displaywriter	
5798-RNZ	Title Insurance - 6580 Displaywriter	
5798-RPA	6580 Data Processing Administrative Manager	
5798-RRE	Displaywriter 3101 Device Emulation/Document Transfer	
5798-RRK	Wholesale Drug (Reportpack)	
5799-BHT	Displaywriter-3277 Device Emulation	3277 terminal emulation that requires the 3277 emulation adapter PRPQ. Superseded by 5799-BKG in November 1983.
5799-BKG	Displaywriter-3277 Device Emulation Document Transfer	3277 terminal emulation which includes the capacity to transfer documents. Requires the 3277 emulation adapter PRPQ.
5799-BQW	Displaywriter Overstrike/Underscore	Enhancement to 5799-BKG to allow overstrike and underscore functionality during emulation.
5799-MP1	Displaywriter Textpack 6 Multipass Equation Print	
5799-WWK	Displaywriter Textpack 6 Multipass Print	
5608-MA1	Displaywriter UCSD p-System: UCSD Pascal Compiler	
5608-MA2	Displaywriter UCSD p-System: Fortran-77 Compiler	
5608-MA3	Displaywriter UCSD p-System: 8086 Native Code Generator	
5608-MS1	Displaywriter UCSD p-System: Runtime System	
5608-MS2	Displaywriter UCSD p-System: Development System	
6403-731	Personal Computer Attach Program	Sold as part of the "IBM Displaywriter/Personal Computer Attach Convenience Kit" (6403-728) PRPQ for the 5150 PC. This feature program allowed document exchange between Displaywriter and personal computer and allowed the Displaywriter to create a privately accessible volume on the personal computer C: or D: drive, effectively giving the Displaywriter a fixed disk.

== Hardware and ROS Embedded Programs ==
The Displaywriter, though often compared to the IBM 5150, was quite different internally. The Displaywriter did not use off the shelf components, an open architecture, or third party peripherals. The electronic components bear a physical resemblance to IBM's enterprise level hardware of the era, and in fact many components have been recycled from other systems, such as certain IBM-branded chips, the monitor (which is a recolored 3101 terminal CRT), the diskette drives, and the keyboard (which is from the IBM 5520 Administrative System).

=== Electronics Unit ===
The physical layout of the system electronics unit, which is the box that the CRT mounts to, consists of a power supply on one half, and cards containing different functions slotted into a backplane with six slots, labeled A-F, that IBM referred to as the system distribution board, on the other half. The system distribution board is passive and has no logic or components of its own. Instead, each of the cards that are inserted utilize the distribution board as an extension of the system bus. The "system card", which is inserted into slot B of the distribution board, contains most of the functions that would be expected on a PC mainboard, including: clock, central processor, ROS ("Read Only Storage", aka ROM), keyboard adapter, interrupt controller and direct memory access controller. However, RAM is not part of the system card and is instead attached as a discrete card in slot E and in some cases also slot F. The disk controller is not located within the electronics unit at all and is instead located within the unit containing the floppy disk drives. Additionally, with some communications configurations, the communications adapter is also located inside the floppy drive unit. These two things necessitated the extension of the system bus outside of the electronics unit through a cable to the drive unit. There is a blue berg connector on the reverse side of the system card that facilitates this. Slot A on the distribution card will contain the communications card when it is not located in the disk unit. Slot C will contain a feature card and slot D always contains the display adapter card.

The Displaywriter contained, at the time, extensive self test features that were stored in ROS (ROM) chips on the "system card".

While proprietary, the Displaywriter hardware was meant to be configurable to tailor suit the needs of the organization ordering the machine and offered multiple configuration options and additional feature cards. Feature cards included: a 3277 emulation card, a 3274/3276 attachment card, a printer sharing card, a single external EIA modem card, a dual external EIA modem card, an X.21 communications card, a local device communications card, an enhanced Chartpack display card and a memory expansion card. Additional configuration options included a 25 or (vertically oriented) 66-line display, one or two disk drives, 1 sided or 2 sided disk drives, a beamspring (Type A) or Model F (Type B) keyboard, and RAM configurations between 128 and 448 KB.

"A basic system — consisting of a display with a typewriter-like keyboard and a logic unit, a printer and a device to record and read diskettes capable of storing more than 100 pages of average text — cost $7,895 and leased for $275 a month."

== Reception and Sales ==
Unlike some of IBM's other distributed solutions of this era, such as the System/23, 5520 and 5280, which floundered and had limited sales, the Displaywriter was initially a modest success. Tom Willmott, director of User Programs at International Data Corporation in the early 1980s, estimated that roughly 200,000 units had shipped within the first two years of the Displaywriter going on sale to the public. Initial reception of the Displaywriter was also favorable. The Textpack software, especially Textpack 4 and 6 with multitasking and macro support, had word processing features that were considered advanced at the time, and the user interface was reported as being simple to navigate. The 8" disks at the time were cheaper, less prone to data corruption, and could hold more data than the contemporaneous 320k 5 1/4" floppies.

According to IBM, their marketing strategy was to offer reduced versions of the full Textpack product and stripped down Displaywriter hardware configurations in order to make the Displaywriter more economical for smaller businesses, who IBM envisioned would choose a cheaper software package and then upgrade as their needs required. However, in practice this was undercut by both the Displaywriter hardware being significantly more expensive than competition in the word processing and general microcomputer spaces and the fact that limitations coded into Textpack prevented a fluid upgrade path for customers in many instances. For example, if a customer were using Textpack 1 and wanted to use their Displaywriter to create graphs and charts, they would need to pay approximately $1,500 ($4,500 in 2023) for Textpack 4, the Chartpack software disk, and the RAM upgrade to support the new software. Additionally, revisions of feature programs were keyed to Textpack maintenance levels. For example, a revision of Textpack 4 from 1984 could not use a revision of a feature program from 1982, it would require a newer revision of that feature program to be purchased.

During the production lifespan of the Displaywriter, Textpack was praised for its functionality and ease of use compared to other word processing options, though the high price tag was criticized, especially in comparison to the IBM 5150 PC and other compatibles. As a result of this, Displaywriter Textpack found strong adoption with clients that had deep pockets, such as in government, higher education, and legal organizations, and poor adoption with small businesses and at-home users. Despite selling UCSD p-System for Displaywriter directly and initially working with Digital Research to create a CP/M-86 port for Displaywriter, the Displaywriter was not ever strongly marketed by IBM as a true microcomputer, and was almost always sold with Textpack. Additionally, the Displaywriter never received any significant display updates to bring its graphical capabilities up to par with the IBM PC or compatibles.

Despite the Displaywriter's initial success, the IBM Personal Computer line, which went on the market in 1981, had even better sales numbers in the same timeframe. As the PC and clone market exploded, Displaywriter sales quickly fell off to near zero in the United States by the end of 1983. According to Computerworld Magazine, one anonymous technician had installed more than 200 Displaywriter workstations between 1982 and 1983, but only a total of 11 in 1984. At that point, DisplayWrite software had been announced and introduced for the PC line, which meant that the Displaywriter had lost its market niche. Critically, a PC cost around $5,000 at the time, whereas a fully equipped Displaywriter could cost as much as $14,000. For most businesses, an IBM PC or a PC compatible was the obvious choice. The established large service contracts with government entities, including the Reagan administration and military buoyed the sales slightly until the Displaywriter was soft-pulled from market in 1986, when IBM announced that it would no longer be fulfilling new orders. Some established service contracts for the Displaywriter did remain in effect until those were sunsetted by IBM in 1999.

== DisplayWrite ==
The Displaywriter's initial success, in conjunction with IBM's 1984 push to unify its office automation products, prompted IBM to develop a parallel to the Displaywriter's Textpack software for the PC line, System/36 line and S/370 line. This software, dubbed DisplayWrite (with a capital w), had improved features over the Displaywriter's Textpacks, such as ASCII file integration, ASCII file editing, and increased printer support, but retained similar menus to the Textpack software. There were initially three tiers of DisplayWrite, which IBM stated were comparable to Textpack 4 and 6, but with the Displaywriter's withdrawal from marketing, DisplayWrite's features ultimately superseded Textpack as support for DisplayWrite continued until 2015.

There were also additional parallels of Displaywriter software released as companion software to DisplayWrite, with the "Extended Spelling Dictionary" getting a parallel release as "DisplayWrite Legal Support" and the Displaywriter Bisynchcronous Communications software getting a parallel release as "DisplayComm Binary Synchronous Communications". The DisplayComm software acted as a document unification platform between IBM PC, System/36, S/370, Displaywriter and 5520 systems and was capable of connecting a compatible system in those product lines to another compatible system in order to exchange documents either way between the two.
