= IBM 5520 =

- Manufacturer: IBM
- Released: 1979; 47 years ago
- Dimensions: 1220x660x1570mm (Central processor unit)
- Related: IBM System/34

The IBM 5520 Administrative System was a text, electronic document‐distribution and data processing system, announced by IBM General Systems Division (GSD) in 1979.

== Configuration ==
The system offered linked text-editing work stations that shared a storage unit a central processor unit (IBM 5525), CRT-based display stations (IBM 5253 and 5254), a daisy wheel printer (IBM 5257) and an ink jet printer (IBM 5258). Depending on the model, from one to 18 display stations and from three to 12 printers could be attached. The processor unit has a same case that used in a IBM System/34 midrange computer.

Other systems, i.e. 6670 Information Distributor, Office System/6, 6240 Mag Card Typewriter-Communicating and System/370 could be connected for electronic document distribution.

== Market share ==
The New York Times quoted a technology analyst's view of the 5520 as "a competitive product in(to) a rapidly growing field."

While the Office System/6 introduced two years earlier by IBM Office Products Division (OPD) was focused on word processing, the new 5520 intended to complement existing products lines with text editing and data processing power. The need for action became urgent because IBM was losing market share to companies such as Wang who exploited display (size), storage (magnetic cards), and computing (performance) weaknesses of IBM's established product lines by aggressive marketing, including direct comparisons.

== See also ==
- Wang WPS and OIS
