= DDC =

DDC may stand for:

== Computing ==
- Digital distribution copy, a pirated movie release type
- Digital down converter, a method in digital signal processing
- Direct digital control, in control theory
- Display Data Channel, a communication protocol between a graphics card and a monitor
- Distributed Disaggregated Chassis, an open design for a router chassis by the Open Compute Project

== Organizations ==
- Dairy Development Corporation, of Nepal
- Dansk Datamatik Center, a defunct Danish software research and development centre of the 1980s
- DDC-I, a Danish and American company created from the work of the Dansk Datamatik Center
- Defense Technical Information Center, formerly the Defense Documentation Center for Scientific and Technical Information
- Detroit Diesel Corporation
- District Development Committee, in Nepal
- District Development Council
- Dzongkha Development Commission
- United States District Court for the District of Columbia

== Science and medicine ==
- Dideoxycytidine, or ddC or zalcitabine
- DOPA decarboxylase, or Aromatic-L-amino-acid decarboxylase

== Transport ==
- Dodge City Regional Airport, Ford County, Kansas, United States (by IATA code)
- Dum Dum Cantonment railway station, Kolkata, West Bengal, India (by Indian Railways station code)

== Other uses ==
- Deep Dickollective, or D/DC
- Dewey Decimal Classification
- Diario de Cuba, Madrid-based Cuban news website
- Double disc court
- Double Dealing Character, the fourteenth mainline entry in the Touhou Project video game series
