= DDRE =

DDRE may refer to:

- Danish Defence Research Establishment of the Military of Denmark.
- Director of Defense Research and Engineering, under the Office of the Secretary of Defense, United States.
- Dance Dance Revolution Extreme, a video game for the PlayStation 2
