= Netsmart Technologies =

American technology company

- Type: Private
- Industry: Health information technology, behavioral health
- Founded: 1968
- Headquarters: Overland Park, Kansas
- Area served: United States
- Key people: Mike Valentine; Tom Herzog; Kevin Kaufman; Wendy Hill
- Products: Electronic health record, practice management software, medical billing
- Revenue: $712 million (2025)
- Number of employees: 2,800 (2026)
- Website: www.ntst.com

Netsmart Technologies is an American health information technology company that develops electronic health records, interoperability, revenue cycle management, artificial intelligence, automation, telehealth and related software and services. Through its CareFabric platform, the company supports organizations and entities in the human services, post-acute, public sector, physical therapy and rehabilitation markets with an integrated framework designed for community-based care providers.

The company was established in 1992, although its origins trace back to Creative Socio-Medics, a behavioral health software company founded in 1968 and acquired by Netsmart's predecessor in 1994. Netsmart has expanded through a series of acquisitions and has been privately owned since 2007.

== History ==
Netsmart Technologies was originally known as Medical Services Corporation. Created in September 1992, this was a holding company which did business under a subsidiary called Carte Medical Corporation. In October 1993, Medical Services Corp. merged its subsidiary into itself and became directly known as Carte Medical. In June 1994, Carte Medical acquired Creative Socio-Medics (CSM).

Creative Socio-Medics had been founded by Gerald O. Koop and John F. Phillips in 1968. It had then been acquired in 1973 by Advanced Computer Techniques (ACT), a New York City-based software company that specialized in language compilers but also engaged in information technology consulting and hosted service bureaus. CSM specialized in delivering software products and hardware and software services in the human services field, specifically for behavioral health providers such as psychiatric hospitals and mental health clinics. In 1989, CSM had stopped sharing physical facilities with the rest of ACT and relocated to Islip, New York on Long Island. CSM had tended to be profitable some years but not other years and was rarely in solid financial shape. By the early 1990s, ACT's other businesses had been closed down and it was motivated to sell CSM as well.

In June 1995, Carte Medical Corporation's name was changed to CSMC Corporation, and in February 1996, the name was finally changed to Netsmart Technologies, Inc. Creative Socio-Medics became the company's operations arm that it did business through.

== Public company ==
James L. Conway, who had previously been an executive for a credit subsidiary of ITT Corporation, became president of Netsmart Technologies in January 1996 and its CEO in April 1998. Several former ACT and CSM executives still held executive or board positions with Netsmart, including Koop and Phillips as well as Chief Financial Officer Anthony F. Grisanti and Chairman of the Board Edward D. Bright. Another former executive, Oscar H. Schachter, did legal work for them.

In August 1996, Netsmart Technologies staged an initial public offering and became a public company. The company was traded on NASDAQ under the symbol NTST.

Around 1999, the company began a period of rapid growth, with revenues increasing almost fivefold over the next six years, with both acquisitions and organic growth being responsible. It was especially strong in contracts with the different states. By the end of 2002, the company had 145 employees. Leading up to 2003, the business of Creative Socio-Medics benefited from the phase-in that year of Title II of the Health Insurance Portability and Accountability Act (HIPAA), which required the establishment of national standards for transactions involving electronic health records. The Avatar software suite from Creative Socio-Medics generally cost from $250,000 to $1 million at that time and covered patient tracking, medical records management, and scheduling and billing for both inpatient and outpatient services.

In 2003, the company moved from Islip to Great River, New York. By 2004, it had been profitable for five straight years and 23 quarters in a row.

By 2005, Netsmart was the largest information technology provider within the behavioral health care sector, with revenues of around $50 million. That year it acquired its biggest competitor, CMHC Systems of Ohio, which was especially strong in community mental health centers, for $18 million. Conway remained CEO of the merged entity. At this point the Creative Socio-Medics and CMHC names were retired and the company operated solely as Netsmart. By the end of 2005 its profitability streak had reached 30 quarters in a row.

== Private equity buyout ==
The purchase of CMHC in turn attracted the interest of private equity firms. In 2006, Netsmart agreed to be bought out by two such firms, Bessemer Venture Partners and Insight Venture Partners, for $115 million.

Shareholders then sued the company on the grounds that Netsmart's board of directors had not looked hard enough for a strategic buyer. The acquisition was held up for a while in early 2007 when Judge Leo E. Strine, Jr. of the Delaware Court of Chancery barred the sale until management better explained its decision to sell the company to these two particular firms. This was done and the sale went through. The case, In Re: Netsmart Technologies, Inc. Shareholders Litigation, became influential in delineating the responsibilities of management when agreeing to a private equity buyout.

== Second private equity buyout ==
In 2010, Genstar Capital, another private equity firm, acquired Netsmart Technologies from Bessemer Venture Partners and Insight Venture Partners. New management came in 2011 in the form of CEO Michael G. Valentine and COO Thomas Herzog, both of whom had previously been senior executives at the health care information technology company Cerner in the Kansas City metropolitan area. Conway went into retirement.

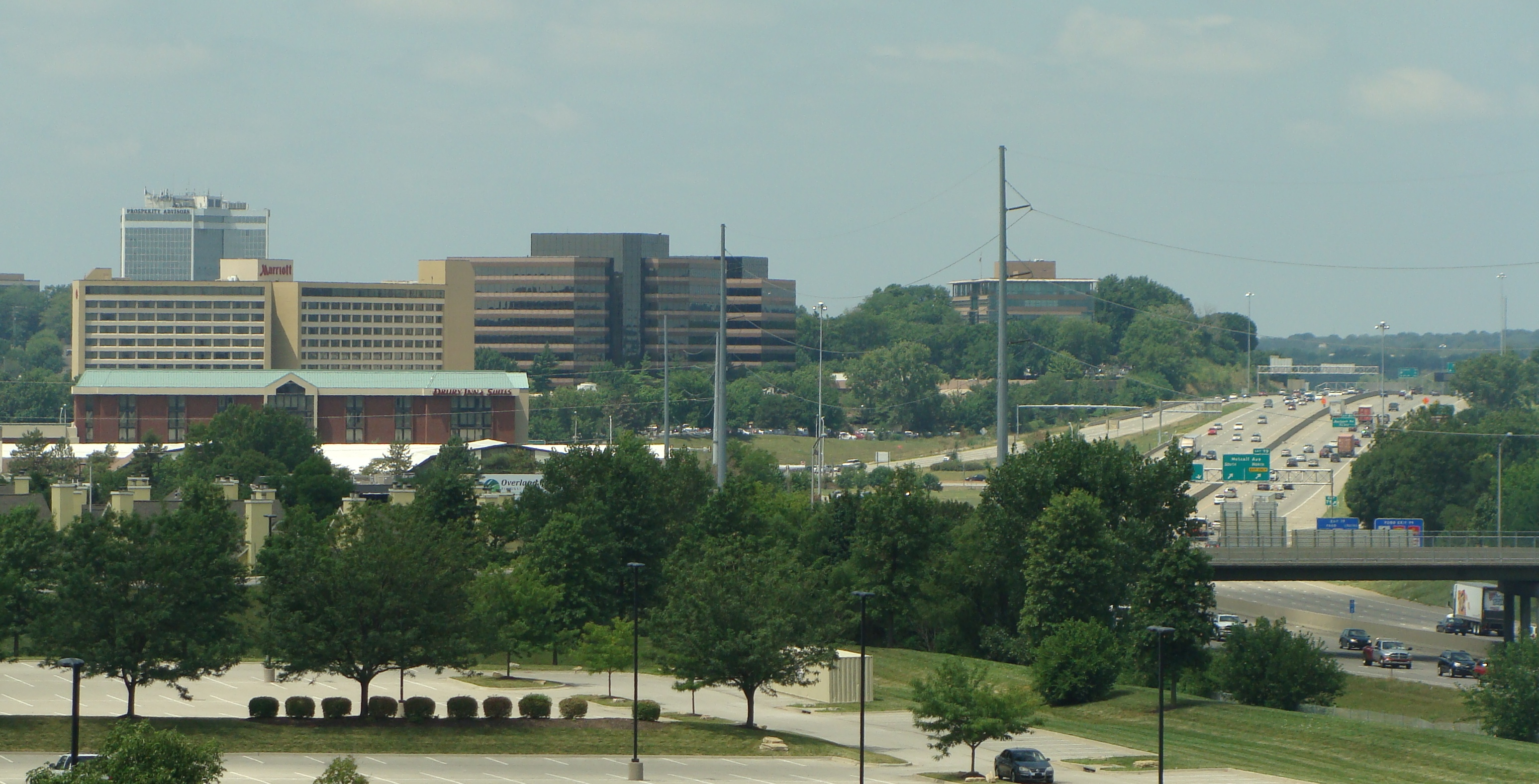
The Netsmart headquarters building is about a mile away from this scene in Overland Park

As a consequence of the management change, Netsmart Technologies relocated its headquarters in that year to Overland Park, Kansas. Many of the company's management functions were moved there, while many development, sales, and legal functions remained in the office in Great River. They constructed a "Solutionarium" with an IMAX-like experience in the headquarters facility to foster collaboration with their customers.

By 2011, there were some 18,000 clients using Netsmart Technologies products or services. The company had 600 employees and revenues of $110 million. Netsmart continued to engage in acquisitions and form alliances, including some in 2012 towards offering cloud services and data mining for behavioral health providers.

== Acquired by Allscripts and private equity ==
In March 2016, Netsmart was bought by a joint venture of GI Partners and Allscripts for $950 million. As part of the arrangement, Allscripts assigned one of its businesses, that dealing with home care, to Netsmart.

In October 2016, Netsmart acquired HealthMEDX, based in Ozark, Missouri, developers of a long-term care electronic health record product.

== Fourth private equity buyout ==
Two years later after gaining it, Allscripts decided to sell its share of Netsmart. The sale was made to two private equity firms, the aforeinvolved GI Partners as well as TA Associates. The motivation of Allscripts was to realize a profit from the two years' involvement and benefit its own balance sheet accordingly.

== Acquisitions and divestments ==
In May 2019, the company acquired McBee, a 250-employee health care consulting firm based in Wayne, Pennsylvania.

In June 2020, Netsmart acquired Quality In Real Time (QIRT), a healthcare IT company based in New York.

In April 2022, Netsmart announced that they acquired TheraOffice (formerly Hands On Technology Inc.), a software-as-a-service company based out of the greater Chicago area in Illinois. TheraOffice produced an electronic medical records and whole-practice management suite for physical therapy and rehabilitation practices.

In October 2023, Netsmart acquired Netalytics, a U.S. software firm specializing in addiction treatment solutions. This acquisition included the addition of Methasoft to Netsmart's portfolio, a software solution used by many federally-approved Opiate Treatment Programs.

== Netsmart India ==
In April 2025, Netsmart announced opening its office in Bangalore, India to facilitate growth of its business solutions. It currently has around 250 employees as of October 2026.
