= Association of British Secretaries in America =

The Association of British Secretaries in America (ABSA) was a New York-based organization of the 1960s and 1970s consisting of secretaries from the United Kingdom who had come to the United States to work and live.

The creation of the association appears to have taken place in New York in 1961. During the 1960s, there was a steady demand for young British women to come to the U.S. and fill temporary or permanent secretarial positions. Reasons stated for the demand included a secretarial shortage in the U.S., better aptitude and seriousness for detail work among the British, and the perceived prestige in the U.S. of having an English accent answer the phone. For the British women who came over, there was a chance for better pay and advancement in the U.S. than within the British class system.

The association's stated purpose was that it "offers assistance to members seeking jobs and apartments, and generally helps girls new to this country to settle in New York." It also helped members navigate the New York social and dating scene, and the association threw parties of their own as well.

The association is remembered for one unusual recorded vocal chorus effort, when they performed IBM corporate spirit songs on the 1969 album Paean. The album was the idea of the computer software and consulting company Advanced Computer Techniques, all of whose secretaries at the time came from England. The album's songs and recordings were judged as "quite endearing" by InfoWorld magazine some years later, and software design pioneer Larry Constantine subsequently described the association's role on the record with just one word: "indeed!"

By 1971, the association had about 80 members. At meetings they discussed, or heard from speakers on, topics such as safety, cultural trips, vacations, and techniques for shorthand. A similar organization at the time was the Society of International Secretaries.
