= Nepal Dairy =

Nepalese ice-cream manufacturing company

- Company type: Dairy
- Founded: 1980
- Founder: Dr. Heramba B. Rajbhandary
- Headquarters: Nepal
- Website: www.nepaldairy.com.np

Nepal Dairy, popularly known as ND's, is the largest ice-cream manufacturing company of Nepal. It was established in 1980 as a cottage dairy in Mahaboudha, Kathmandu. Initially, it used to sell yogurt in clay pots. Besides dairy produces, currently, it produces cheese, pizzas and pastries. The dairy gets milk from Dhapakhel, Panauti, Dhulikhel and Panchkhal.

== History ==
The company was established by Dr. Heramba B. Rajbhandary in 1980, after his PhD in Dairy technology, to ease the shortage of processed milk in Kathmandu. Initially, it used to sell yougurt. Later, it diversified to produce various products. The company, currently, sells about 17 flavours of ice-cream and is considered one of the main industry to supply ice-cream inside Nepal.

== Social significance ==
Nepal Dairy started to train college students for dairy processing with aim to set up Nepal Dairy Institute of Technology and Management and provide experience to the younger generation.

== Recognition ==
- Nepali Times selected it as the company of the month in 2008.

== See also ==
- Dairy Development Corporation
