= Advanced Computer Techniques =

Computer software company

Advanced Computer Techniques Corporation
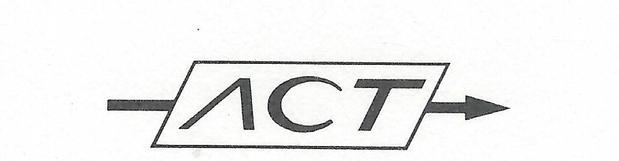
- Type: Public
- Traded as: Nasdaq: ACTP
- Industry: Computer software; information technology consulting; service bureaus
- Founded: New York City (April 1962)
- Founder: Charles Philip Lecht
- Defunct: 1994 (effectively)
- Fate: Inactive
- Headquarters: New York City, United States
- Number of locations: several including Washington, D.C.; California; Canada; Milan, Italy.
- Key people: Charles P. Lecht; Oscar H. Schachter; Edward D. Bright; John F. Phillips; Frank J. LoSacco; Gerald O. Koop
- Products: Compilers and related language development tools; applications systems for commercial data processing
- Services: Behavioral health services, others
- Revenue: $18 million (1982, equivalent to $60 million today)
- Number of employees: over 300 (1981)
- Divisions: Applications; Systems; Consulting; Federal; Publishing; BASE; Informa-Tab
- Subsidiaries: Creative Socio-Medics; InterACT

Advanced Computer Techniques (ACT) was a computer software company most active from the early 1960s through the early 1990s that made software products, especially language compilers and related tools. It also engaged in information technology consulting, hosted service bureaus, and provided applications and services for behavioral health providers. ACT had two subsidiaries of note, InterACT and Creative Socio-Medics.

Both writer Katharine Davis Fishman, in her 1981 book The Computer Establishment, and computer science historian Martin Campbell-Kelly, in his 2003 volume From Airline Reservations to Sonic the Hedgehog: A History of the Software Industry, have considered ACT an exemplar of the independent, middle-sized software development firms of its era, and the Charles Babbage Institute at the University of Minnesota has also viewed the company's history as important.

== Founding and early history ==
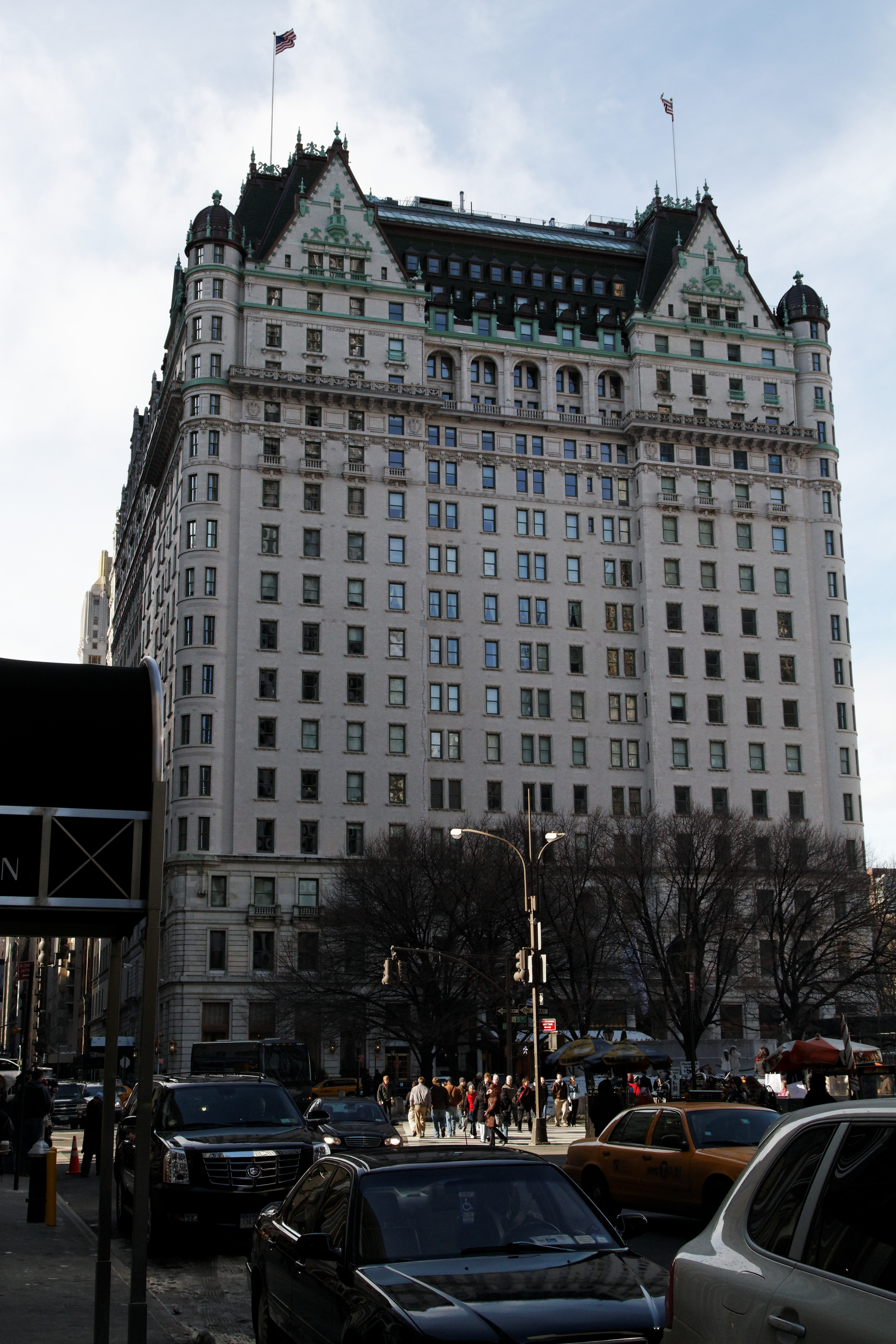
ACT spent its first few years in converted space atop The Plaza hotel on Fifth Avenue and 59th Street in New York (here seen in 2010).

Advanced Computer Techniques was founded in New York City in April 1962 by Charles P. Lecht. It had an initial capitalization of $800, one contract, and one employee. Lecht, in his late twenties at the time, was a mathematician and entrepreneur whose involvement with the computer industry dated back to the early 1950s, including stints at IBM and the MIT Lincoln Laboratory.

The new firm's first job was fixing a language compiler on the UNIVAC LARC computer, which was being used by the United States Navy. UNIVAC awarded a $100,000 contract for the work; Lecht hired some programmers and the company's first office was in former servant quarters atop the Plaza Hotel. The firm was one of 40–50 software companies started in the early 1960s, many of which would go on to be forgotten.

Working on compilers continued to be part of the company's early efforts; its first compiler, for the FORTRAN language, was developed in the mid-1960s. This was followed by a COBOL compiler later in that decade. As the 1960s went on, ACT built a customer list of established companies and developed a reputation for delivering quality work on schedule. In September 1964 the company leased regular office space, the first of several locations it would have during its lifetime, all of which were within greater Midtown Manhattan on or near Madison Avenue. In addition to UNIVAC, early customers for the firm's compiler work included IBM as well as Honeywell. The company also developed some of the System/360 utilities for IBM.

With few trained computer programmers available at the time, Lecht hired those with musical, linguistic, or mathematical backgrounds, finding them to be successful at this new activity. The firm also did other system software as well as scientific programming projects, including some for the defense industry, and then started doing commercial applications development for large companies such as Union Carbide, United Airlines, Hoffman-LaRoche, and Shell Oil. Lecht fostered a relaxed working environment where dress was informal and hours flexible. He instituted a series of weekly reports that all developers had to file detailing their progress; these were communicated to the client, on the theory that "a client can get angry at us, but [they] can't be more than one week angry at us because we told [them] exactly where we were."

== Management personality ==
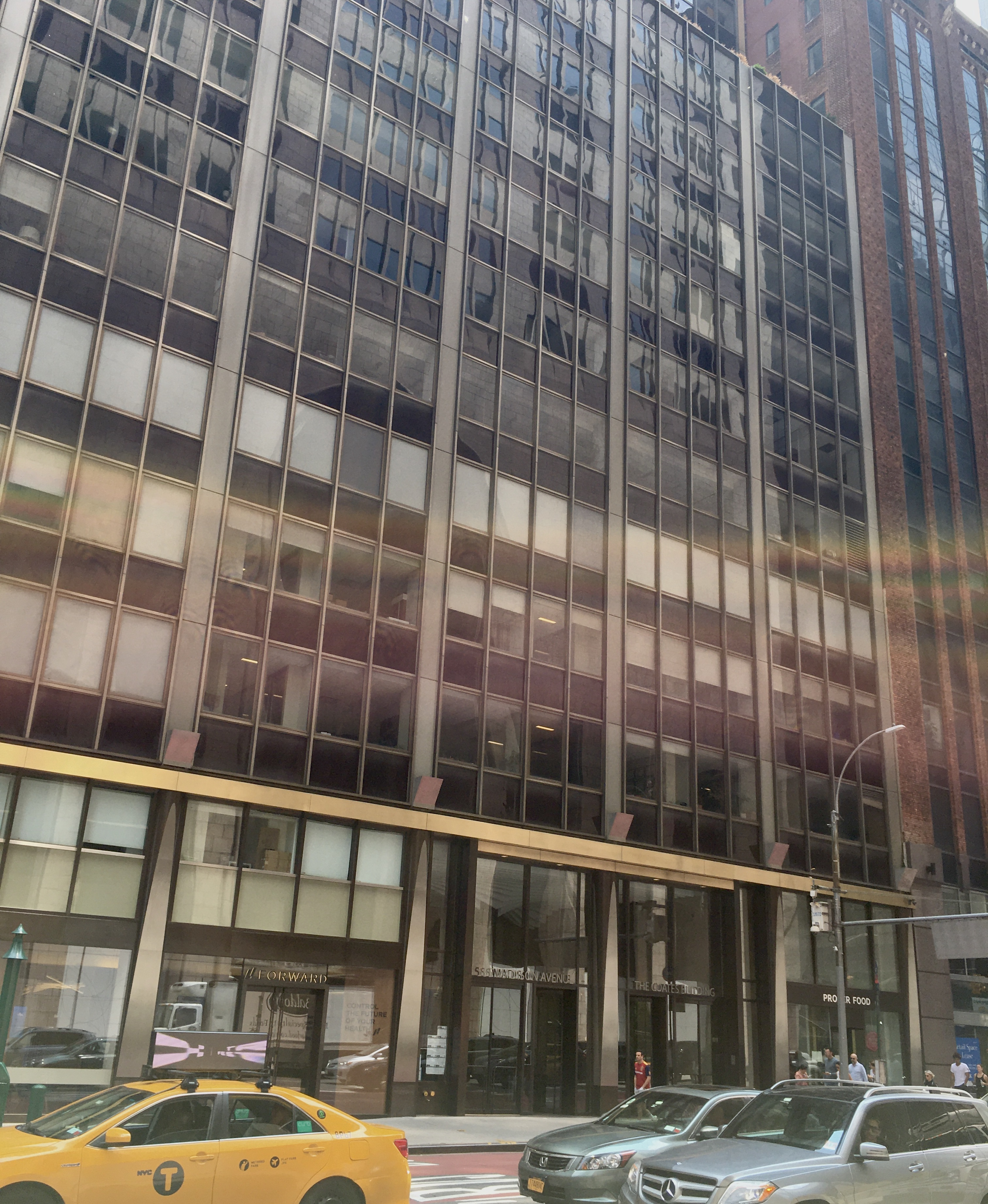
ACT had its second office at 555 Madison Avenue, by 56th Street (here seen in 2023).

Lecht was a colorful and flamboyant character with an idiosyncratic sense of style, who went around on a motorcycle and was described as a "showman" by colleagues, customers, and competitors alike. At one point his office and desk were completely covered by silver square tiles. ACT benefited from his flair for publicity: He, together with the company, was profiled in The New Yorker in 1967 and later in industry publications such as Datamation, which once referred to him as "One of computerdom's most flashy characters". Even decades later, a computing historian recalled Lecht as "one of the real characters in the industry, a very, very unusual man."

Lecht published several textbooks on programming covering different languages. ACT organized a series of seminars for the American Management Association on project management for developing computer applications. The seminars were organized into a 1967 book by Lecht, The Management of Computer Programming Projects, that was likely the first book ever published on the topic. The company also published A Guide for Software Documentation in 1969, compiled and edited by Dorothy Walsh, which was again one of the first of its kind and was cited by a number of other publications in the years to follow.

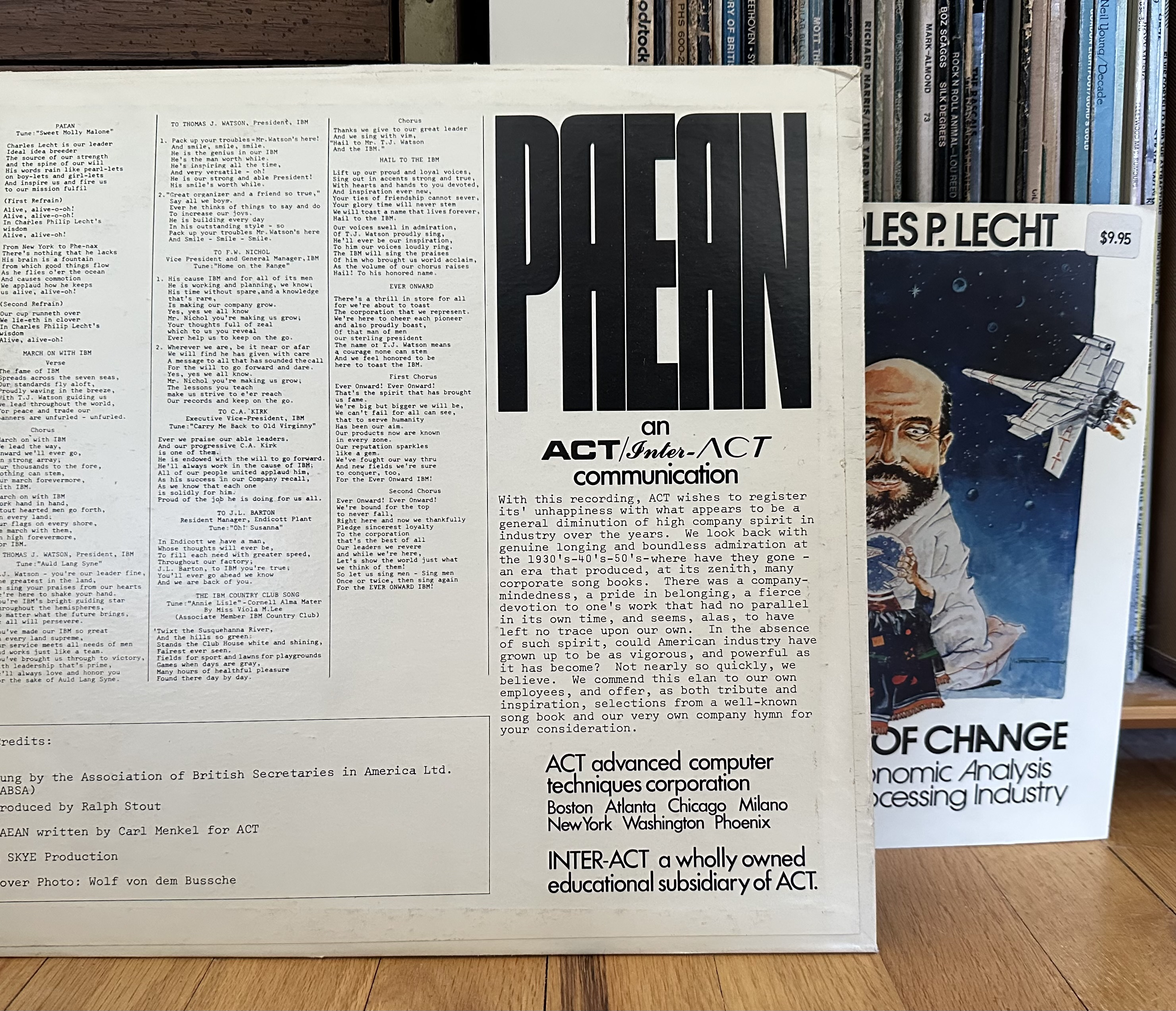
The Paean album and the Waves of Change book

Perhaps the most strangely famous of Lecht's outputs was the album of IBM corporate spirit songs that he had recorded by the Association of British Secretaries in America (for a while all of ACT's secretaries came from England). Entitled Paean, and with album sleeve text bemoaning the loss of the company-mindedness of the 1930s–1950s, it was released via Skye Records in 1969. It became a popular giveaway at trade shows such as the Joint Computer Conferences. The title track, set to the tune of "Molly Malone", was adapted in praise of Lecht himself:

Charles Lecht is our leader
Ideal idea breeder
The source of our strength
and the spine of our will

Lecht's book The Waves of Change, which attempted to foretell changes in the computer industry, was serialized in Computerworld magazine in 1977 (a first for a trade publication) and published by McGraw-Hill in 1979. The foreword was written by Gideon I. Gartner, who would soon found the influential information technology research and advisory firm the Gartner Group. Waves of Change sold well and received a positive reception. The books, along with his national speaking and lecturing engagements, bolstered both Lecht's and ACT's visibility within the technology industry.

The eccentricities of the president were balanced by the firm's second-in-command, executive vice-president Oscar H. Schachter, a lawyer who had graduated from Yeshiva College and Harvard Law School and who had a more straight-laced personality. Schachter was a neighbor of Lecht's who did some legal work for the company during its inception, served on its early board of directors for a few years, and then joined the company full-time in 1966. As Schachter later said, "I was kind of the governor ... The person who sat on Charlie, or tried to."

While with ACT, Schachter would also become a significant and respected presence in the Association of Data Processing Service Organizations (ADAPSO), a rapidly growing industry organization during the 1960s and later. Schacter served in a number of roles with ADAPSO, including providing written testimony to the United States House of Representatives. He became chairman of ADAPSO's vendor relations committee in 1980, a body that engaged in discussions with IBM about that company's policies towards independent software vendors.

ACT was ahead of the industry in hiring female executives. There were several at the vice presidential level in the late 1970s and early 1980s.

== Expansion and diversification ==
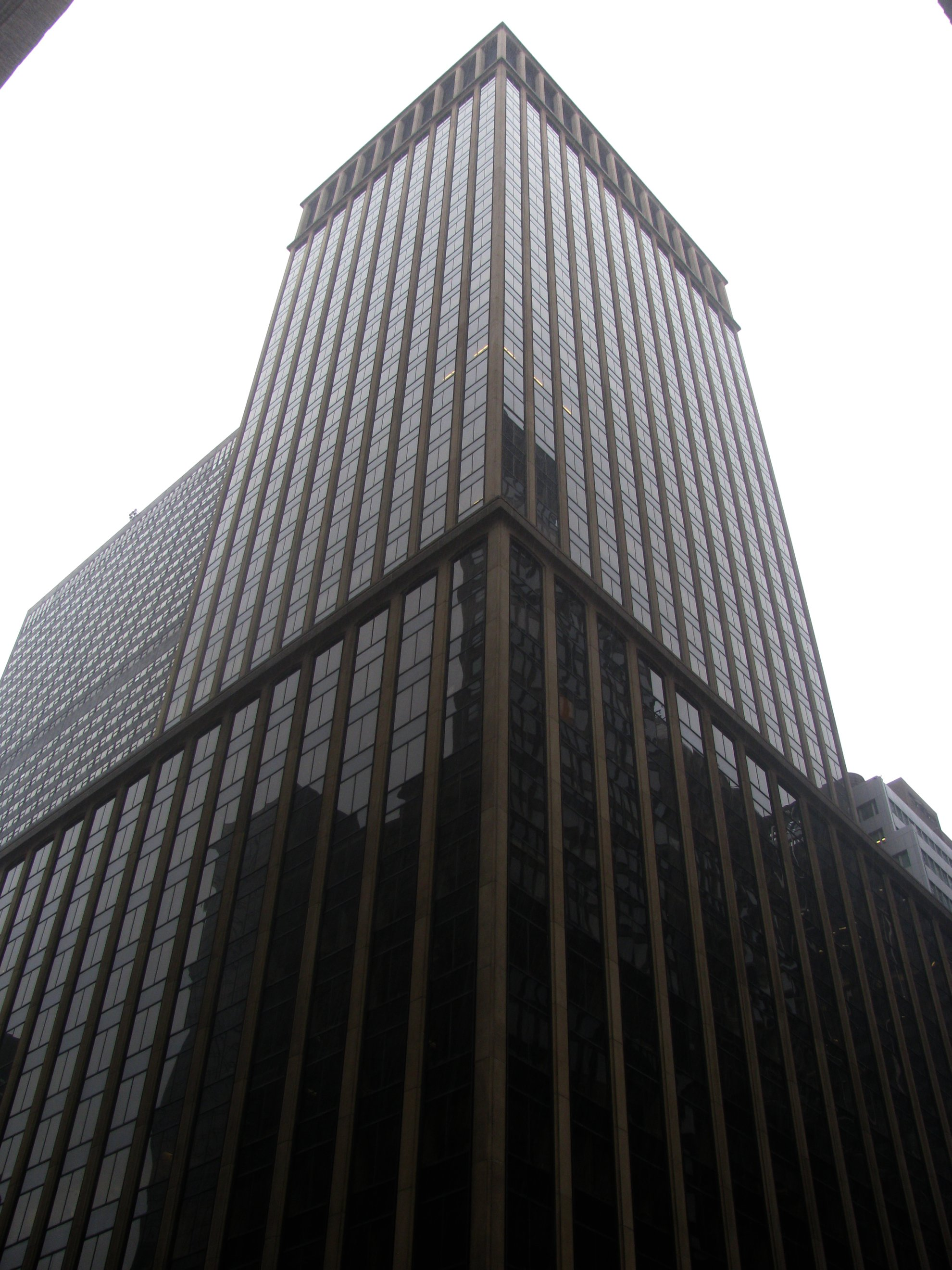
During 1969 to 1982, ACT had its main offices in this tower at 437 Madison Avenue by 49th Street (here seen in 2011).

ACT became a publicly owned company in May 1968. The initial public offering was handled by boutique technology underwriter Faulkner, Dawkins & Sullivan, and the stock value increased almost four-fold during the first day of trading, ending with a three-fold gain that The New York Times termed "spectacular". The firm had captured a wave of investor interest in technology stocks.

ACT had revenues in the $2.5-3.2 million range during 1968–70. It began a course of diversification beyond consulting and software development by acquiring, in 1969, Rhode Island Lithograph, a printing company in the state of Rhode Island (that was owned by Lecht's brother Danny), and Informatab, a data processing market research company, and by opening Inter-ACT, a training and education arm that wrote computer help manuals that were sold to schools and businesses. During 1968, the company decided to extend its Phoenix presence by opening a real-estate division called Advanced Realty Techniques. Lecht had a goal that ACT be a "supermarket of services for the computer industry". As Schachter would later recall, "We did everything."

Software houses of the time tended to suffer from unprofitable contracts, failed ventures, and slowing demand. During 1971–72, ACT suffered a downturn, showing its first annual losses; Lecht closed several offices and laid off half of the firm's employees, but the firm survived when many others did not. By 1974, its revenues had reached the $5 million mark.

The most important diversification was into service bureaus, which by 1979 accounted for some 40 percent of the company's revenue. These bureaus, which provided their own equipment to handle the data processing needs of clients, were located in New York, Phoenix, Tucson, Edmonton, and Milan, and each tended to specialize in a particular area, such as the Edmonton one reporting on inventory and financial status for the Canadian oil and construction industry. There were also consulting offices for various periods of time in London, Paris, Chicago, and Atlanta. For overseas engagements, the company tended to bring over U.S. employees, especially ones who were multilingual, rather than attempt to hire locally. A compiler for the IBM RPG II language was developed for Olivetti computers, based in Ivrea, Italy.

In 1975, the nuclear theorist and Hudson Institute founder Herman Kahn became a member of ACT's board of directors. Kahn also appeared with Lecht as keynote speakers at the Future Systems Forum. This was a prognostication-focused event that ACT headlined or sponsored for a few years beginning in the late 1970s, and that also featured ACT's Robert Fertig.

The company also began entering the packaged software business. But Lecht's visibility within the industry only went so far; the company lacked an effective marketing capability for its products to go further. In addition, the company struggled with the transition in business models from customers fully funding projects and owning the end results, to an approach where the company would have to make periodic investments in its own products to keep improving them.

During the 1970s, the company established an office in Tehran. Over time IBM withdrew from that market and the regime of Shah Reza Pahlavi decided to standardize on the Honeywell 6000 series for the Iranian military. ACT gained a subcontract from Honeywell's Italian subsidiary to do an inventory systemompany also began entering the packaged software business. But Lecht's visibility for the Imperial Iranian Air Force and Information Systems Iran. The name Inter-Act was again used for this venture. The contract represented up to a quarter of ACT's business for a while, but then ended without ACT being fully paid, and following the Iranian Revolution, ACT became party to the Iran–United States Claims Tribunal. In 1983 it received an award of some $300,000 from the tribunal.

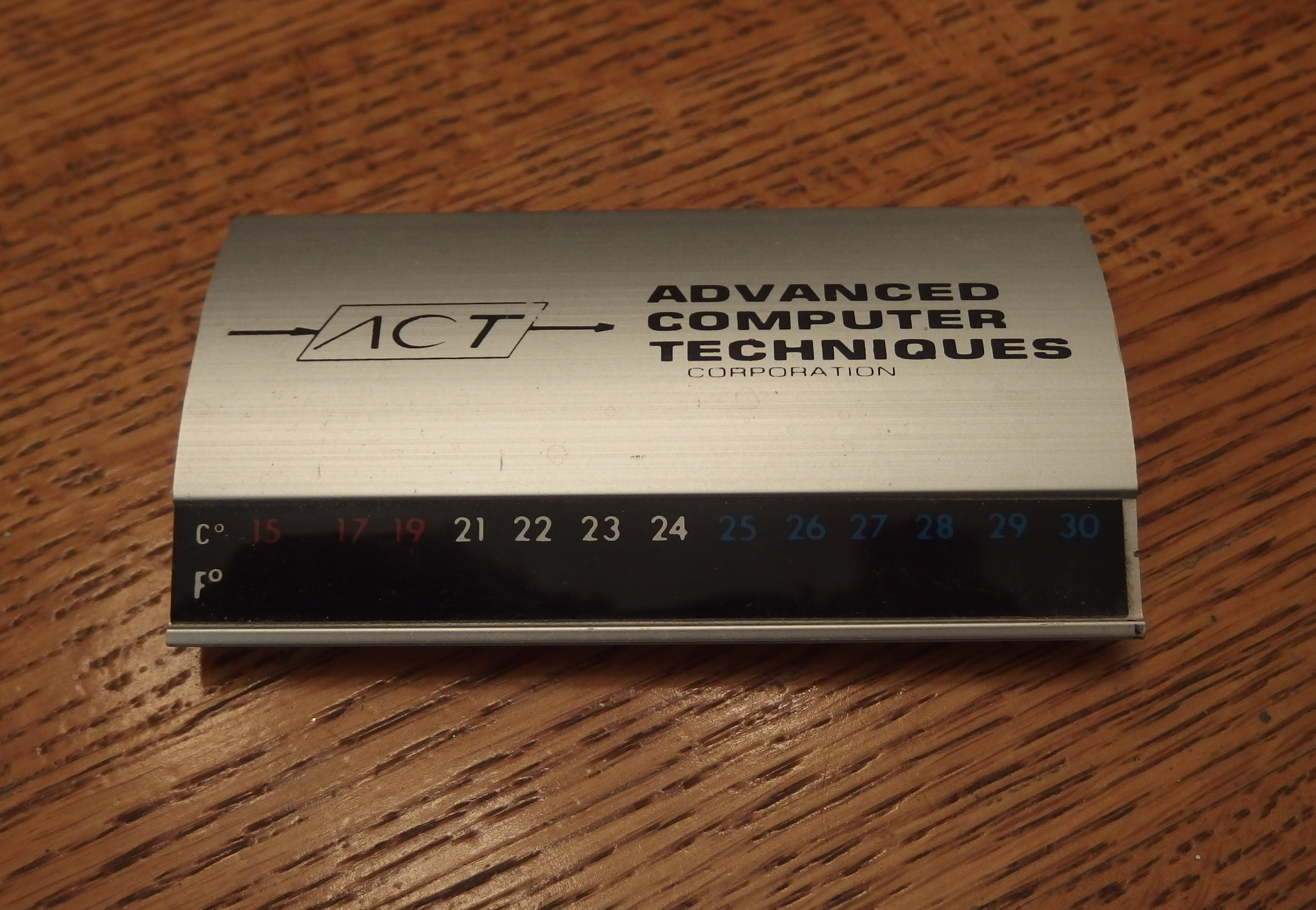
An ACT promotional item: a room thermometer paperweight

ACT was also an earlier entrant in the word processing field in the mid-late-1970s, acquiring Base Information Systems and its Ultratext System technology and partnering with Honeywell to put the system on the Honeywell Level 6 minicomputer. The product received a positive review in Computerworld in 1976 and was still being actively marketed in 1979. But Wang Laboratories captured much of this word processing market; the Ultratext product may have been overly complicated and Schachter later lamented that ACT letting the opportunity to make an impression in this domain slip away was "one of our worst failures".

By 1979, ACT was effectively a worldwide mini-conglomerate. It had revenues over $16 million and in terms of size was in the top 60 of over 3,000 companies in the software, services, and facilities management sector. It derived approximately equal revenues from overseas as from the U.S. The company typically was engaged with between fifty and seventy clients at any given time. By 1981 the company stated it had 318 employees. Its display advertising for programming positions it was hiring for was a familiar sight in computer trade papers such as Computerworld. It still had its idiosyncratic characteristics; Lecht spoke publicly about a psychologist who visited ACT to discuss employee complaints, saying it saved him two days a week worth of work and predicting it would become a future corporate trend.

== Change at the top and refocusing ==
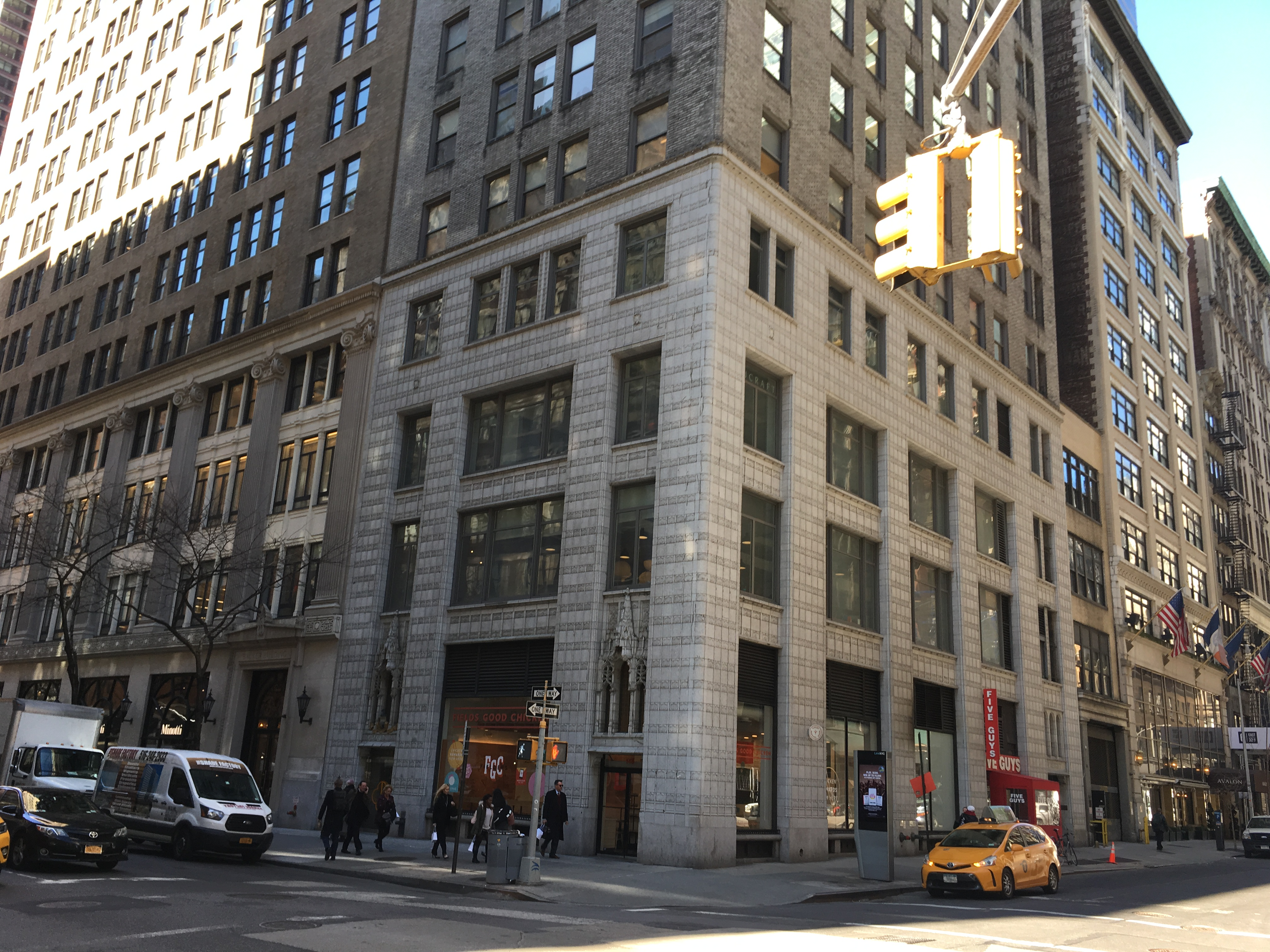
From 1982 to 1989, the offices of ACT were located at 32nd Street and Madison Avenue (here seen in 2019). One entrance was in the building at the far right, 16 East 32nd Street, while the other entrance at the far left, 136 Madison Avenue. The two buildings adjoined with connecting passage at the rears.

Heretofore, the compilers developed by ACT had been done for single customers according to their specifications; but beginning in the late 1970s, the company began developing compilers as software products instead, products that could be licensed and sold to multiple customers. The advent of minicomputers created a market for the compilers, and the company believed that profit margins would be higher on product sales than it was on custom software development contracts. In particular, there was an effort to develop a family of portable compilers, such that much of the compiler could be reused when moved to a new platform or architecture, and only a portion of it would have to be rehosted or retargeted by either the customer or by ACT under a consulting arrangement. These were new implementations compared to ACT's earlier ones, made to conform to the Fortran 77 and COBOL 74 standards as well as to the relatively new Pascal language. The COBOL compiler was implemented in Pascal, as were the Fortran 77 and Pascal compilers. Although making use of Pascal, the compilers generated native machine code, rather than p-code, as optimized generated code was a goal.

This compiler work was done in connection with a multi-million dollar contract with the United States Army, including for its Materiel Development and Readiness Command (DARCOM). The compilers were made for the Honeywell Level 6 minicomputer with the GCOS 6 Mod 400 operating system, and then for a variety of other platforms. The Fortran 77 compiler product was completed first in 1980; there were significant delays involved with the other two, but they were completed during 1981.

In the early 1980s a change hit the company. The company's revenues stayed in the $15–16 million range during 1980 and 1981, but it lost over $0.6 million in the first year and over $1.5 million in the second. Several business, including the service bureaus, were losing money, and there were substantial cost overruns associated with the Pascal-based compilers. In addition there were accounting problems in 1980 regarding the accumulation of costs on some long-term contracts.

By Schachter's later telling, the San Francisco investment firm Birr, Wilson made a capital infusion into the company and placed a member on the board of directors. That director was unsatisfied with how Lecht was running the company, in particular the number of different businesses ACT was in and Lecht's disinclination to close down the unprofitable ones. The inside board members then joined with the outside one and asked Lecht to go. Schachter later said, "It was, of all the things I did in my entire business career, the most difficult thing I ever did, but I just felt the company was at severe risk of going bankrupt if we didn't really take a different position and a different posture."

In May 1982, Lecht departed ACT. When it happened, Lecht portrayed the split as his own choice to the press, saying he wanted to pursue writing, speaking, and other activities related to technology. But as Datamation wrote at the time, the departure came "with more than a little pushing". Lawsuits were filed between the company and Lecht; they were settled in February 1983 in an agreement that involved the company buying back Lecht's shares. (A few years later, Lecht said he had left because he became saddened watching the company spirit he had established turn into what he called a "bureaucracy of yuppie nincompoops". He went on to form Lecht Sciences Incorporated, which included him working from a Tokyo base.)

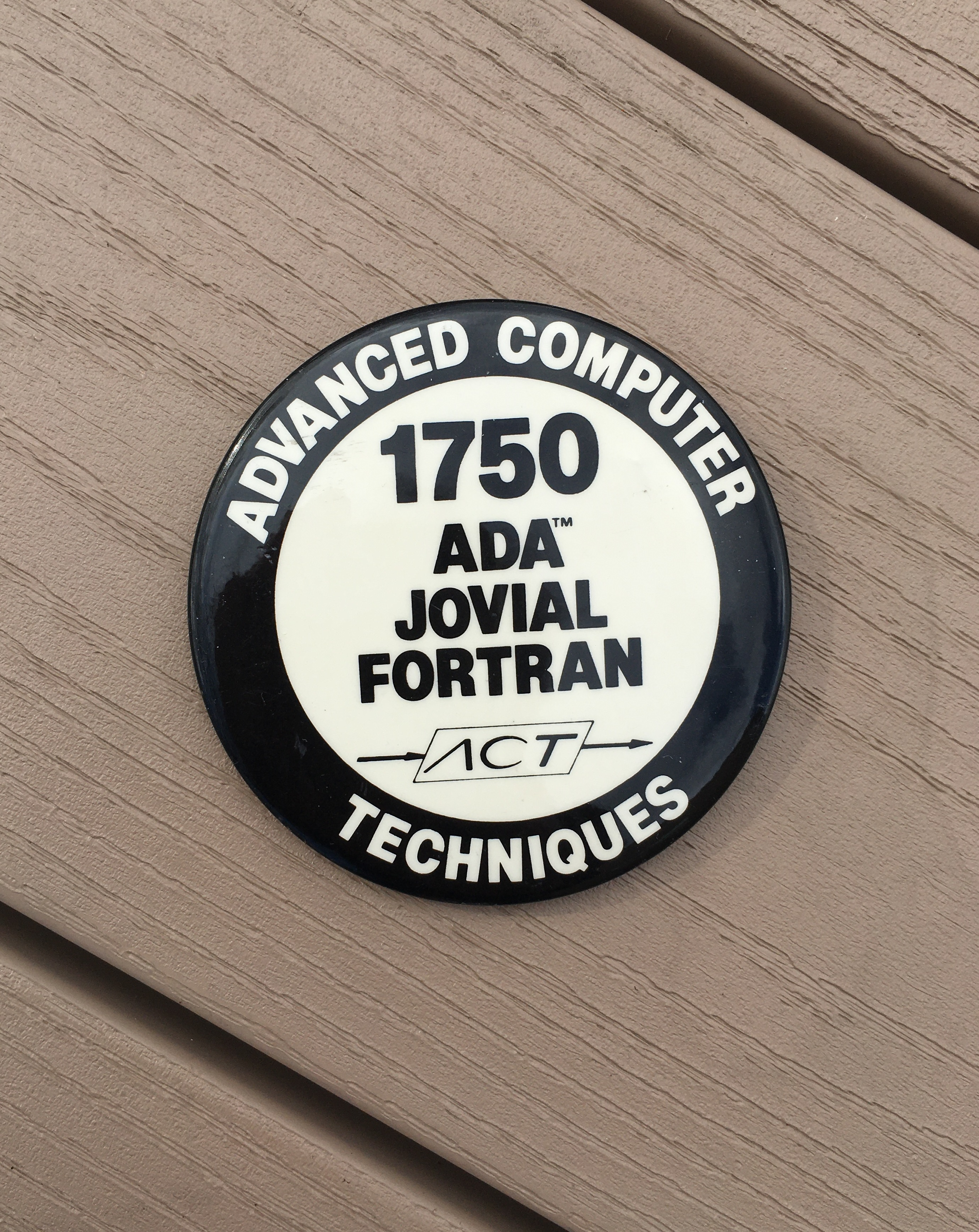
Pin button illustrating the three languages for which ACT offered cross-compilers to the MIL-STD-1750A

Schachter became president upon Lecht's departure, and, a year later, CEO. During the rest of 1982, the company sold off its two main service bureaus, those in Phoenix and Edmonton, and closed down two smaller money-losing businesses. The company became profitable again during the second half of 1982. Revenue, which reached an all-time high of $18 million for all of 1982, fell to $11 million the next year as a result. But it then climbed steadily back up, reaching $15 million by 1986, while operating profit also gradually improved, surpassing $1 million in 1986.

During the 1980s, the company expanded its language products into those desired by the defense industry for embedded systems deployment. The first JOVIAL compiler was produced in 1981, targeted for the Zilog Z8002 16-bit, small memory processor. This was soon followed by a JOVIAL compiler targeted to the popular MIL-STD-1750A 16-bit processor architecture specification. With these compilers came associated tools such as assemblers, linkers, runtime systems, simulators, and symbolic debuggers. These cross-development tools were typically hosted on either IBM System/370 mainframes or VAX minicomputers running VMS. General Dynamics became the biggest customer for the JOVIAL product, especially for its use in the avionics for the F-16 Fighting Falcon, but it was sold to a number of other defense contractors as well.

Reception center at the 32nd Street office of ACT in the mid-1980s

In 1984, the company received $3 million in funding for new products from Prudential-Bache Securities. This was used to continue the development of commercial language compilers: A BASIC compiler was developed in 1985, which along with COBOL, FORTRAN, and Pascal, was supplied to AT&T Computer Systems' 3B series computers. A C language compiler was developed by 1986. Around the same time, the commercial compilers were enhanced to support the latest standards, COBOL-85 and draft FORTRAN 8X, as part of a contract for compilers for the BiiN joint venture.

The cash infusion from Prudential-Bache was also used to develop a compiler system for the Ada programming language, targeted to the MIL-STD-1750A architecture. This consisted of a compiler front-end licensed from DDC-I in Denmark (itself an offshoot of the Dansk Datamatik Center) married to a compiler back-end from ACT that made use of the company's existing tools for the MIL-STD-1750A. ACT became the first U.S. company to successfully validate an Ada 1750A compiler past the strenuous Ada Compiler Validation Capability (ACVC) validation suite. Between JOVIAL and Ada, the company would gain a number of high-profile defense contractors as customers throughout the 1980s.

The company also continued its commercial applications group, in particular working during the early-mid 1980s on a major contract for developing parts of Chemical Bank's pioneering home banking system called Pronto. Customers would use the system on at home on Atari 8-bit computers, which would connect via a modem and telephone line to a Tandem Computers system at Chemical Bank's headquarters facility. However the bank's system was ahead of its time and despite heavy promotion did not gain much use. ACT's applications group was closed down in 1986.

== InterACT ==
In July 1987, ACT transferred its software division of compilers and related tools to a new joint venture called InterACT that was two-thirds owned by LSI Logic and one-third by ACT. (This was now the third time that some form of 'InterACT' had been used.) The goal of InterACT was to produce a set of products for what it termed the CASHE space (Computer Aided Software/Hardware Engineering). This would include ACT's existing compilers, assemblers, linkers, simulators, and debuggers; a CASE tool, Interactive Development Environments's Software Through Pictures; a CAE tool, LSI Logic's LSI Design System; and novel components, including bridged hardware and software simulation models and graphic editors and administration tools allowing automated composition of all the other tools. The total set of products, initially called CASHE but then called the System Design Environment (SDE), was aimed at providing embedded systems developers a way to design, simulate, and debug their embedded applications while hardware was still being developed, without having to wait for a prototype. Another motivation for ACT entering into the agreement was to gain access to LSI Logic's sales and marketing operation, which was much larger than its own. The company's work on commercial compilers was gradually shut down, although a C cross compiler to the Intel i960 embedded architecture was completed and had some sales success.

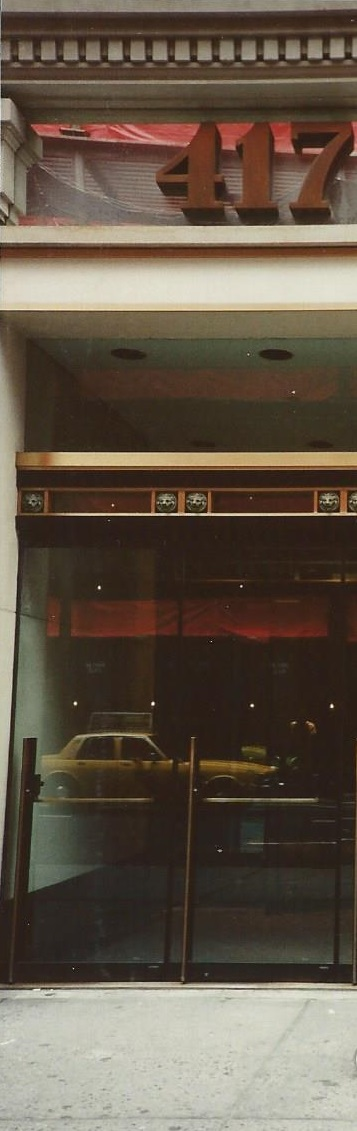
Entrance to 417 Fifth Avenue between 37th and 38th Street in 1989, where the offices of InterACT were from then until 1991

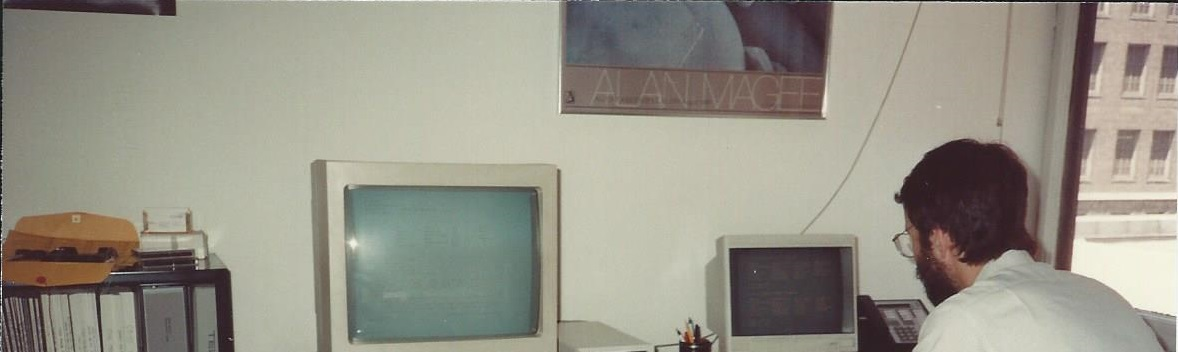
A scene and a view from the InterACT offices in 1991

Schachter was initially CEO of InterACT, but then Edward D. Bright, who had held several executive positions with ACT, took over, while Schachter remained CEO of ACT. InterACT lost money from the start: $0.5 million in the second half of 1987 and $2.5 million in 1988. The new SDE product proved difficult and expensive to build, and after a while LSI Logic wanted out.

An executive at IBM became very interested in the potential of SDE, at a time when IBM was making investments in a number of small companies. Thus, in November 1988, InterACT bought back LSI Logic's ownership, and sold 40 percent of the company to IBM and 11 percent to Prudential-Bache Securities. The new owners were not made public until February 1989 when there was unusual volatility in ACT's stock. As of March 1989, ACT (including InterACT) had about 140 employees.

By 1990, the full SDE idea had been abandoned, and focus was instead placed on the administration tool that had been created. Dubbed the InterACT Integrator, it was hosted on Sun Microsystems workstations and positioned as a data management framework for the integration and automatic sequencing of CASE tools and other software packages. However it failed to find a market.

Meanwhile, InterACT continued to develop and sell the Ada and JOVIAL products on their own. In 1988, the company made a licensing arrangement with MIPS Computer Systems to gain access to the compiler back end technology for the MIPS R3000 RISC microprocessor, and commenced work on an Ada cross compiler system for the R3000.

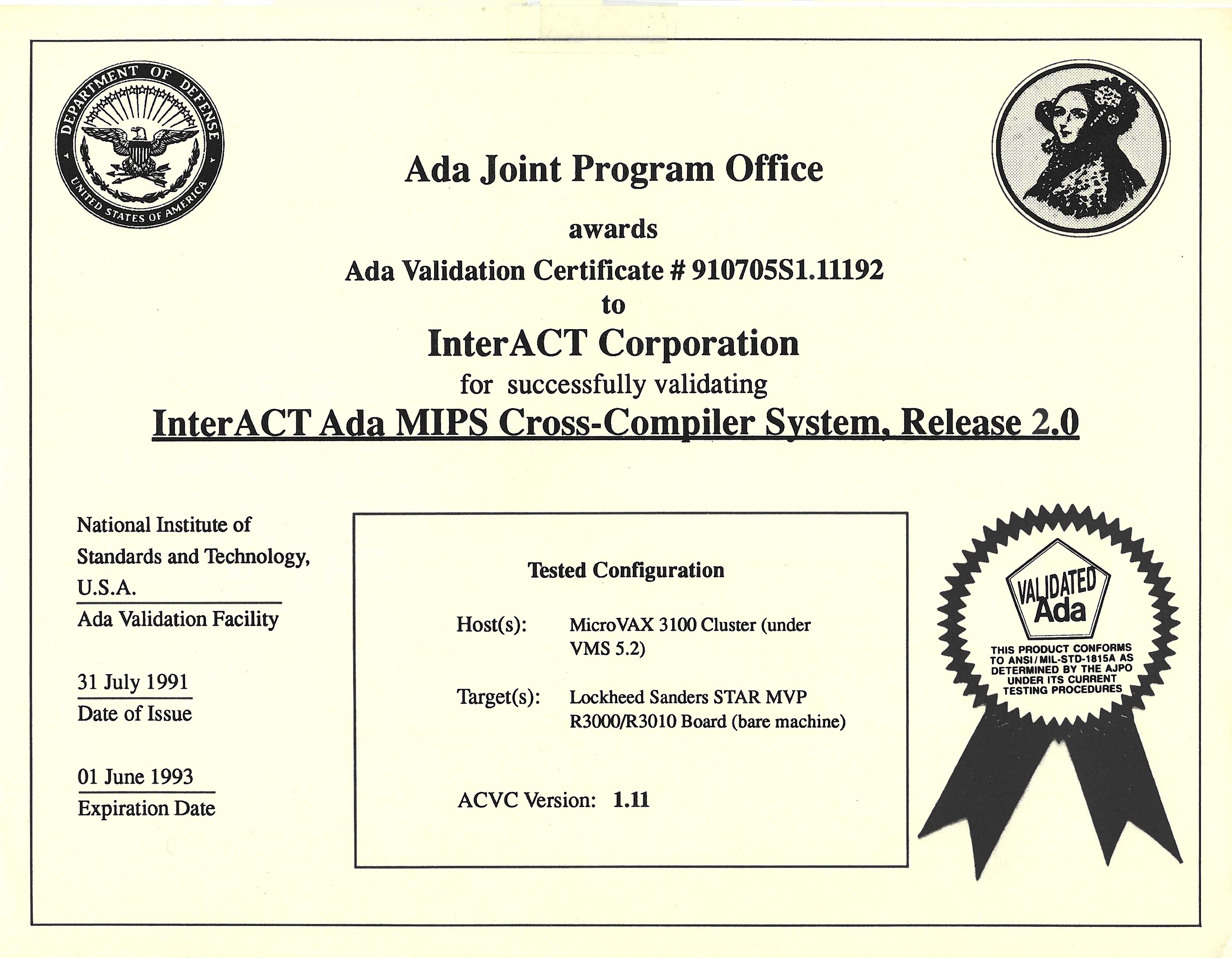
An ACVC validation certificate for the InterACT Ada MIPS R3000 product

First validated and released in late 1989, one of the first to do so, the Ada cross compiler product for MIPS R3000 made a number of sales. The InterACT R3000 product featured a simulator and symbolic debugger as well as some extra Ada runtime system features. The Joint Integrated Avionics Working Group (JIAWG), a United States government initiative of the late 1980s intended to establish common standards for the next generation of U.S. Air Force, Navy, and Army aircraft, selected the R3000 as one of two 32-bit instruction set architectures for real-time embedded systems applications (the other being the Intel i960). An evaluation by the Westinghouse Electric Corporation of these two processors in an embedded systems context selected the InterACT Ada compiler for use as a toolset. Ada was a difficult language to create compilers for, and InterACT's was one of those that revealed some immature implementation characteristics.

In any case, InterACT's business health continued to worsen and, starting in September 1989, there were a number of rounds of layoffs. In October 1991, it was announced that DDC-I had acquired the Ada and JOVIAL embedded systems business of InterACT. What remained of the SDE/Integrator business was shut down.

== Creative Socio-Medics ==

In 1973, ACT acquired Creative Socio-Medics (CSM), which had been founded by Gerald O. Koop and John F. Phillips in 1968. It specialized in delivering software products and hardware and software services in the human services field, specifically for behavioral health providers such as psychiatric hospitals and mental health clinics. These included large, networked installations, such as for the Psychiatric Institutes of America and the New Jersey Department of Human Services. The subsidiary also employed research analysts who studied behavioral health issues.

Originally, CSM systems worked via batch processing. In the 1970s, CSM made the move to deploy its software to online minicomputer systems that were provided to customers as turnkey systems. Near the end of that decade, all of CSM's applications were converted to being implemented using the MUMPS programming language, which went on to become a common choice within the healthcare industry.

For the most part, CSM operated independently of the rest of ACT's activities, but there were occasional collaborations, such as when the parent produced MUMPS implementations for the Digital Equipment Corporation PRO series microcomputers and Tandem Computers NonStop fault-tolerant product line, or when ACT's Network Processor product was used underneath CSM's Human Services Network Information System.

Over time, CSM grew as a subsidiary corporation of ACT. It became a major contributor to ACT's overall financial picture and received prominent attention in ACT's annual reports throughout the 1980s. It tended to be profitable some years and not other years and was rarely in solid financial shape. In 1989, CSM stopped sharing physical facilities with the rest of ACT, and relocated to Islip, New York on Long Island.

In June 1994, Creative Socio-Medics was sold to a company known as Carte Medical.

== Fate and legacy ==
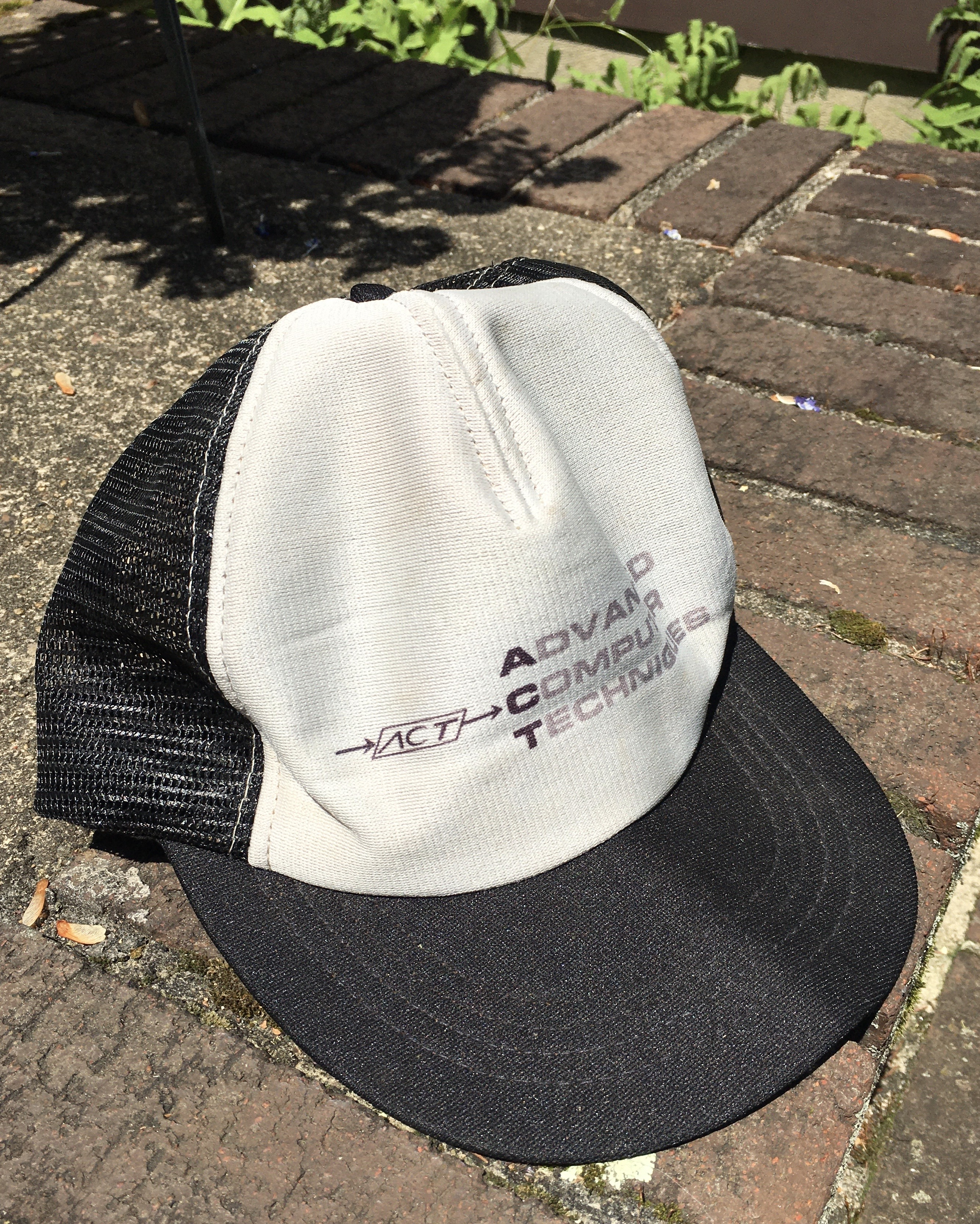
An Advanced Computer Techniques branded baseball cap, seen decades after the company's effective existence ended

Once CSM was sold, ACT had no remaining operations or assets, only lingering corporate debts. It took the money from the CSM sale and paid off its debtors a reasonably high partial amount on the dollar. As Schachter later said about ACT, "We just faded away. We never dissolved. We never declared bankruptcy ... we just kind of faded away."

Former employees of ACT went on to work elsewhere on compilers and various kinds of system software. The most notable such endeavor was Edison Design Group. Founded by one of ACT's compiler designers J. Stephen Adamczyk in 1988, and with several ex-members of ACT's commercial compiler group working for it over the years, they produced a very successful front-end implementation for the C++ programming language and became well-regarded contributors to the ISO C++ standardization effort. As for Schachter, he went into private practice as a lawyer wherein he provided counsel to several companies in the technology area, and also served as vice president and secretary of the board of directors of American Friends of Yahad-In Unum.

After acquiring and rebranding the ACT/InterACT JOVIAL and Ada compiler products, DDC-I continued to develop and market them throughout the 1990s; they were still listed as legacy products on their website into the 2020s.

Creative Socio-Medics became a success story. Carte Medical, the company that bought it in 1994, changed its corporate name to Netsmart Technologies in 1996 and went public later that year. Creative Socio-Medics remained the company's operations arm that it did business through. By the 2000s it was steadily profitable; after acquiring a large rival in 2005, the Creative Socio-Medics name was retired in favor of just Netsmart. The company sold for $115 million to a pair of private equity firms in 2007 and had 600 employees by 2011. Several changes of private ownership followed. The company continued to grow, and by 2023 had some 2,600 employees.

In retrospect, Schachter said of working at Advanced Computer Techniques, "I thoroughly enjoyed being part of this group. They were a group of really bright people. It was a fun company to work for ... I am just sorry we weren't more successful than it turned out we were."

== Bibliography ==
- Campbell-Kelly, Martin (2003). From Airline Reservations to Sonic the Hedgehog: A History of the Software Industry. Cambridge, Massachusetts: MIT Press. ISBN 978-0-262-03303-9.
- Fishman, Katharine Davis (1981). The Computer Establishment (paperback 1982). New York: McGraw-Hill Book Company. ISBN 978-0-07-021127-8.
- Haigh, Thomas (2004). An Interview with Oscar Schachter. Minneapolis: Oral History Collection, Charles Babbage Institute, University of Minnesota. hdl:11299/107622. WorldCat entry
- Lecht, Charles P. (1977). The Waves of Change: A Techno-Economic Analysis of the Data Processing Industry (paperback 1979). New York: McGraw-Hill Book Company. ISBN 9780070369672.
