= Dairy Development Corporation =

Public dairy enterprise in Nepal

DDC
- Dairy Development Corporation
- दुग्ध विकास संस्थान
- Type: Governmental
- Headquarters: Kathmandu
- Location: Nepal
- Coordinates: 27.712434°N 85.330689°E
- Products: Dairy products
- Owner: Government of Nepal
- Board Chair: Dr. Ram Nandan Tiwari
- General Manager: Sanjeev Jha
- Endowment: (1969)
- Website: DDC

Dairy Development Corporation (Nepali: दुग्ध विकास संस्थान) or commonly known as DDC is a public enterprise owned by the Nepal Government which collects milk, produce dairy products and supplies to the customers. The corporation was established in 1969. The main aim of DDC is to guarantee market and fair price to the milk producers and supply hygienic milk and milk products to urban centres. DDC has 45% of the market share in Nepal, while remaining is catered by private dairies.

== History ==
Dairy Development Commission was formed by the government in 1955. The commission was converted into the dairy development board in 1962 and this board created the Dairy Development Corporation in July 1969 under the Corporation Act 1964 (2021 BS).

== Milk collection ==
DDC buys milk of cow, buffalo and nak/chauri (female Yak)from 33 districts throughout Nepal. Approximately 60,000 farmers supply milk to the corporation. It collects milk regionally though local collection centres run by following schemes:

Scheme	Established date	Capacity (liters/day)	Remarks
Kathmandu Milk Supply	1956	75000	
Biratanagar Milk Supply Scheme	1973	25000	
Hetauda Milk Supply Scheme	1978	15000	
Dairy product production and sales and distribution scheme	1979		This project does not buy milk.
Pokhara Milk Supply Scheme	1980	10000	
Lumbini Milk Supply Scheme	1990	2500	
Mid-Western Milk Supply Scheme	2000	8000	

== See also ==
- Nepal Dairy
- Agriculture in Nepal
