= Airplane Information Management System =

The Airplane Information Management System (AIMS) is the integrated avionics system of Boeing 777 aircraft, produced by Honeywell Aerospace.

== History ==
The Intel 80x86 processor was the first to be used for the system, in conjunction with a compiler and runtime system for the Ada programming language. Beginning in 1988 and continuing for a number of years, Honeywell Air Transport Systems worked together with consultants from DDC-I in collaboration to retarget and optimize the DDC-I Ada compiler to the AMD 29050 architecture for use in full scale development. The Airplane Information Management System software would become arguably the best-known of any Ada project, civilian or military. Some 550 developers at Honeywell worked on the flight system.

The original system, AIMS-1, was first introduced with the introduction of the Boeing 777 in 1995. An updated version, AIMS-2, was introduced in 2003.

== System ==
=== Primary Functions ===
- Cockpit Displays (primary flight display, multifunction display, EICAS)
- Flight management system
- Thrust management system (Autothrottle)
- Aircraft condition monitoring system
- In-flight datalink (ACARS/CPDLC)
- Flight deck communication
- Central maintenance system
- Flight data acquisition system

=== Other Functions ===
- Flight Data Recorder System
- Aircraft Conditioning Monitoring System

=== Back-End ===
- Four ARINC 629 buses for information transfer
- Two primary avionics cabinets, located under the cockpit in the avionics bay

== See also ==
- Integrated Modular Avionics (IMA)
- Cockpit display system
