= Danish Defence Research Establishment =

Disbanded Danish Defence research organisation, superseded by Defence Materiel Service

Coordinates: 55.7178°N 12.5729°E

Danish Defence Research Establishment (Danish: Forsvarets Forskningstjeneste) short FOFT was the consultative, guiding and promotion organ in the scientific and technical area for the Danish Armed Forces. It was an independent institute under the Ministry of Defence. FOFT was located on Svanemøllens Barracks in Copenhagen.

Established in 1970 as a successor to Forsvarets Forskningsråd, it had a status of sector-research-institute, on the same line as example Arbejdsmiljøinstituttet, Statens Institut for Folkesundhed or Statens Serum Institut.

FOFT represented the Danish military in international research-fora, like NATO Research and Technology Organisation (RTO) or Western European Armaments Group (WEAG).

On 31 December 2006 the agency was disbanded and the responsibilities transferred to Defence Materiel Service.
