= Island Ink-Jet =

Island Ink-Jet was a large printer ink and laser toner supply chain store with stores in Canada and Puerto Rico. The brand was currently owned by The Equipment leasing company ltd. and based in Mississauga, Ontario, Canada, and locations operate under a franchising business model. The chain offered a printer ink cartridge refill service and sold several varieties of ink cartridges and toner cartridges including remanufactured cartridges.

== History ==
The company was founded by Carey Porcher and Rob Dixon in Courtenay, British Columbia in 1999. The first major expansion came under Ontario businessman Armin Sachse, who purchased the franchise rights for Ontario and opened three initial locations under his company "The Equipment Leasing Company Ltd.

Franchises quickly spread through 2006, as locations opened across Canada, the United States, and Mexico. ranking first in category for the 2005 franchise 500 (A listing of the top franchisors globally) and opening 260 stores by 2007. As of June 2005, the chain had 222 locations—146 in Canada, 73 in the United States, and 3 in Mexico. At that point there were 1103 total stores that specialized in offering ink cartridge refill services in North America and Island Ink-Jet had captured 20% of the in-store ink cartridge refill marketplace. It was second-largest ink-refill chain, behind only Cartridge World. A large portion of these locations were in mall kiosks.

With a general decline in the field of independent cartridge refillers, Island Ink-Jet closed their wholly owned USA company Island Ink-Jet Systems USA in 2008, which had operated 134 locations in the United States.

In early 2009, Alex Schulz reviewed the franchisor's 2008 financial statements and realized that the franchisor was functionally insolvent and was likely to close in the near future. As the most successful franchisee within the system, having opened over 55 locations and owning 12 within their group of companies, they stepped in to take over the brand. The pair created an interim associate group capable of supplying stores with product should the franchisor close. In the fall of 2009 the franchisor closed its doors and stores continued to operate thanks in part to the associate group.

The Equipment Leasing Company Ltd. then filed suit against the franchisor in Courtenay BC, which was completed in late 2009. The company won a court order and pursuant to that court order all intellectual property relating to the Island Ink-Jet brand including and not limited to trademarks, websites, manuals, files and more were acquired by The Equipment Leasing Company Ltd. The Equipment Leasing Company ceased all franchising activity in 2010 and opted to create a licensing model whereby stores operate pursuant to a licensing agreement with the licensor. This program took over from the associate group model with the primary difference being that the licensing model ensures the integrity of the trademarks for all parties. All prior franchisees were provided the right (not requirement) to opt into the new licensing program and the majority of stores across Canada exercised this option. Stores that did not exercise this option have been required to remove any branded signage and are no longer part of the Island Ink-Jet brand.

In 2011, Island Ink-Jet launched its online store allowing consumers to purchase directly online.
