= Compatible ink =

Type of printer ink

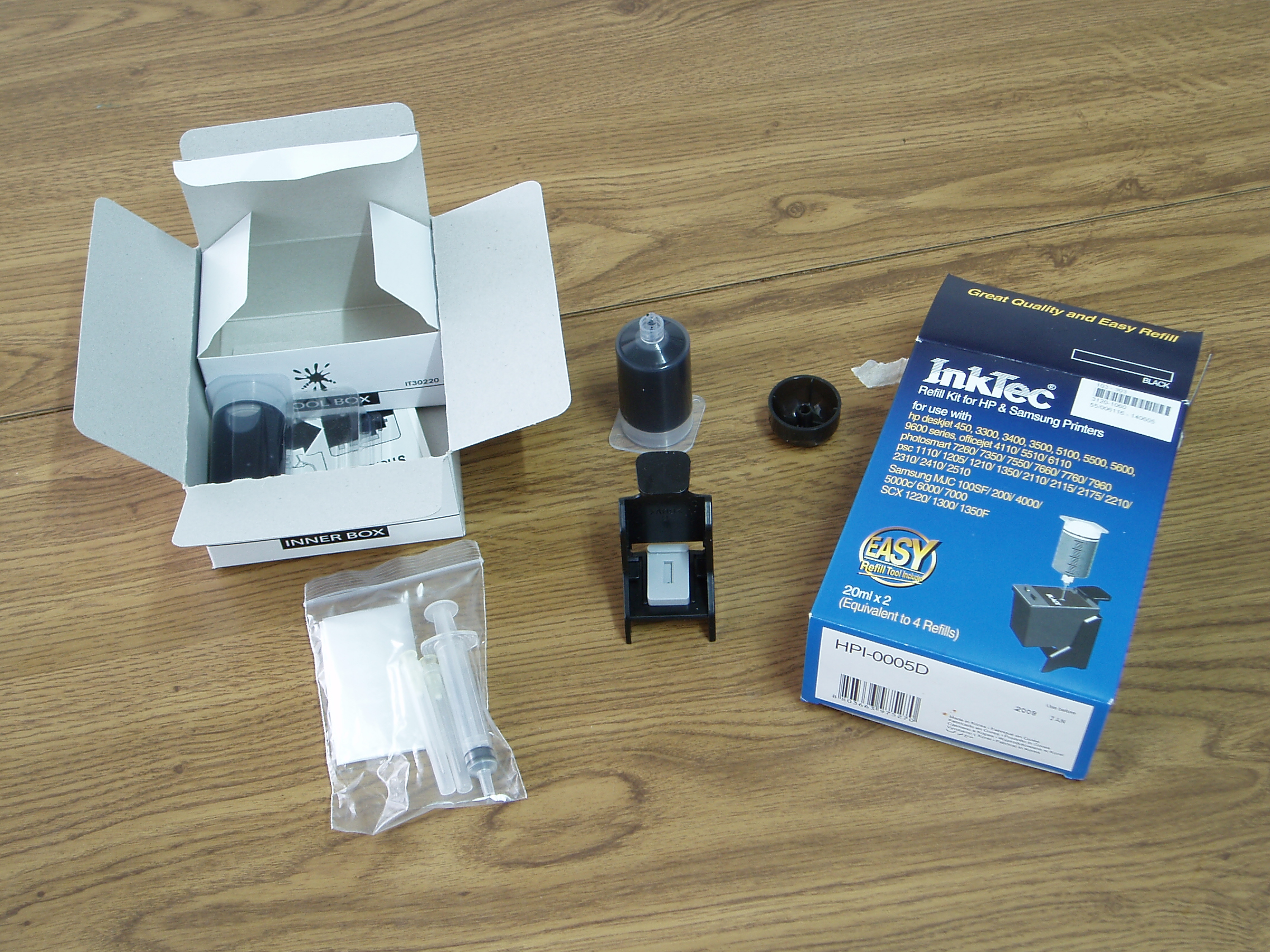
Cartridge refill kit for HP and Samsung black ink cartridges

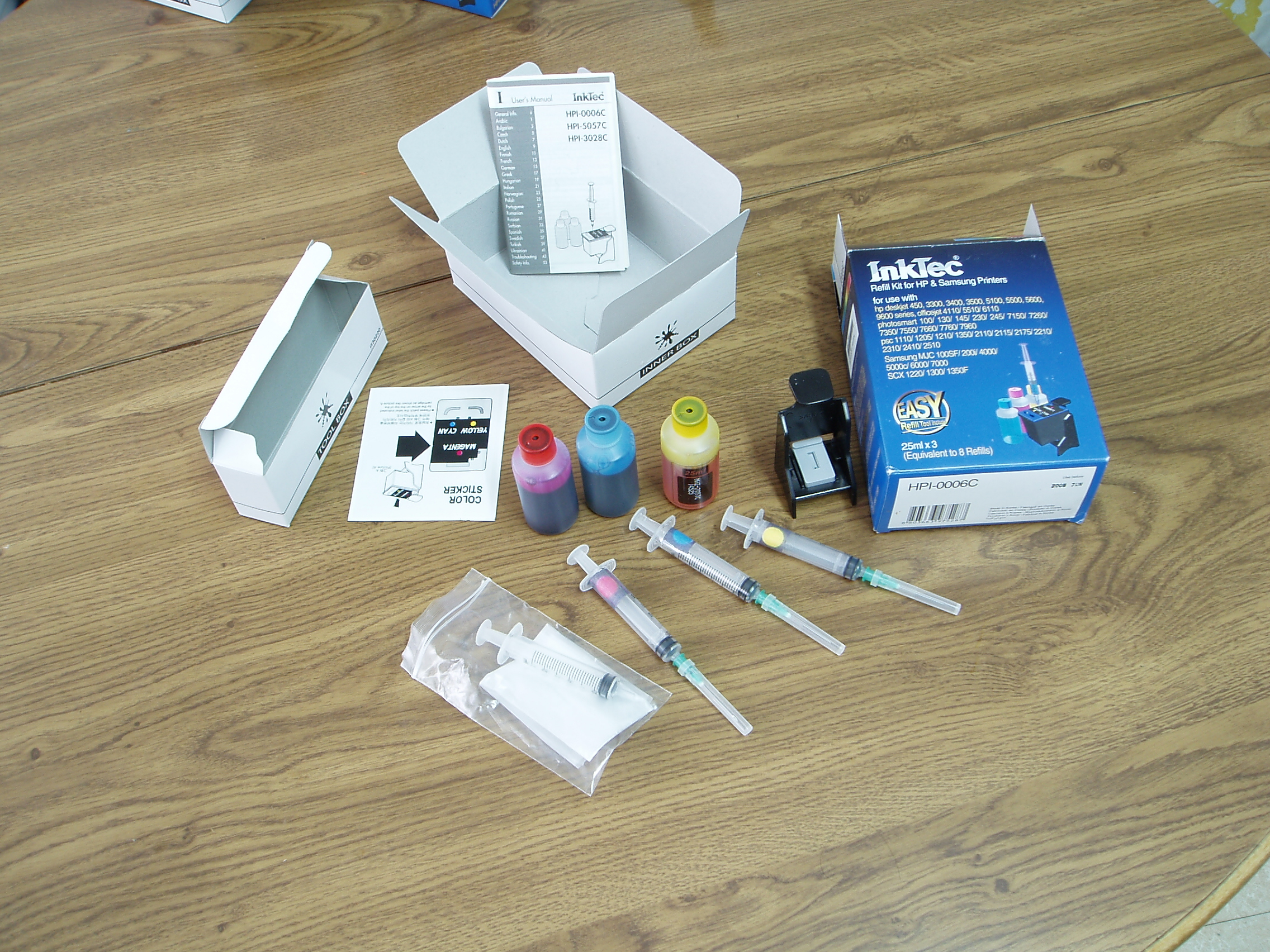
Cartridge refill kit for HP and Samsung tri-color ink cartridges

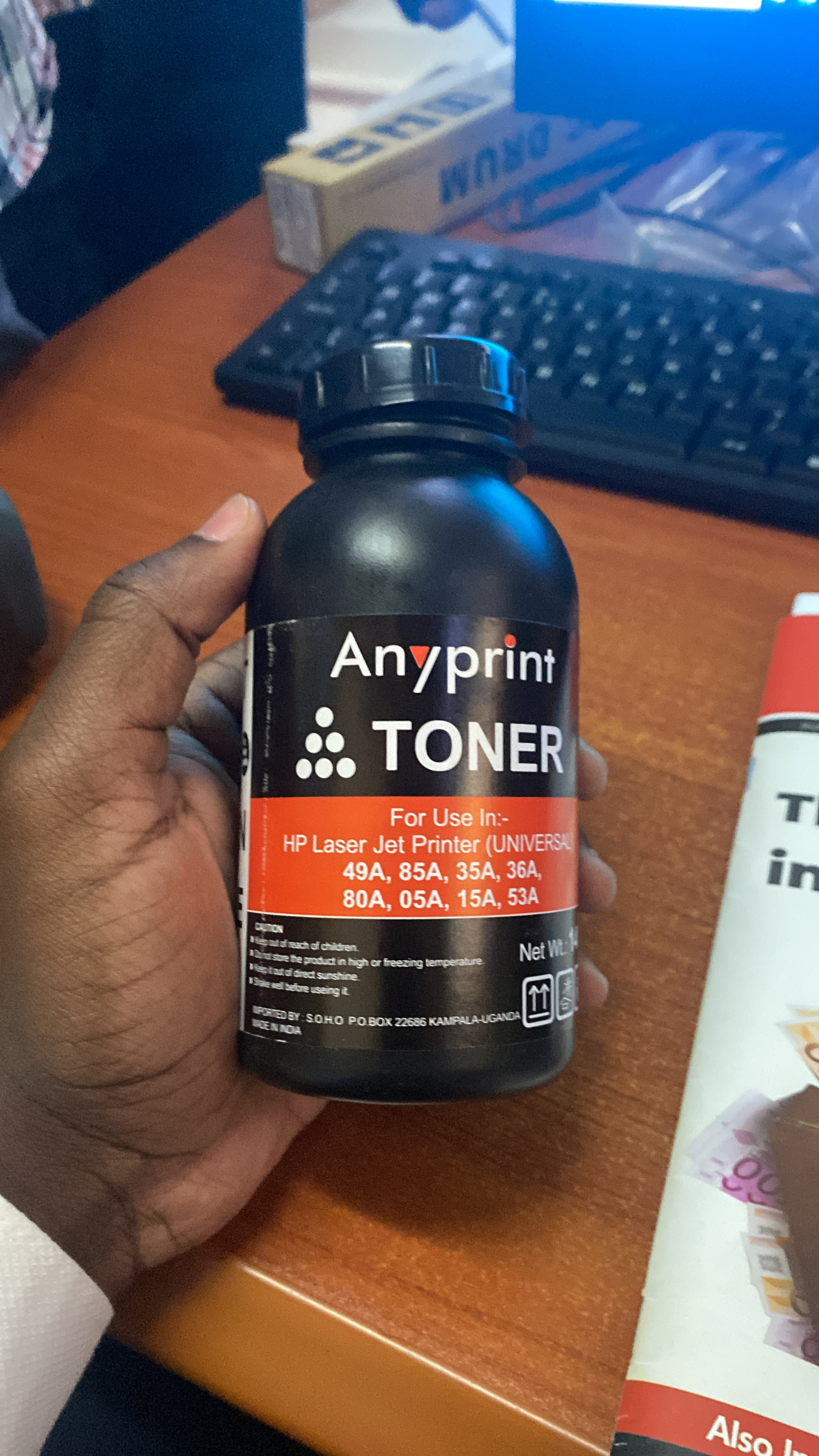
Container with compatible toner for HP LaserJet printers

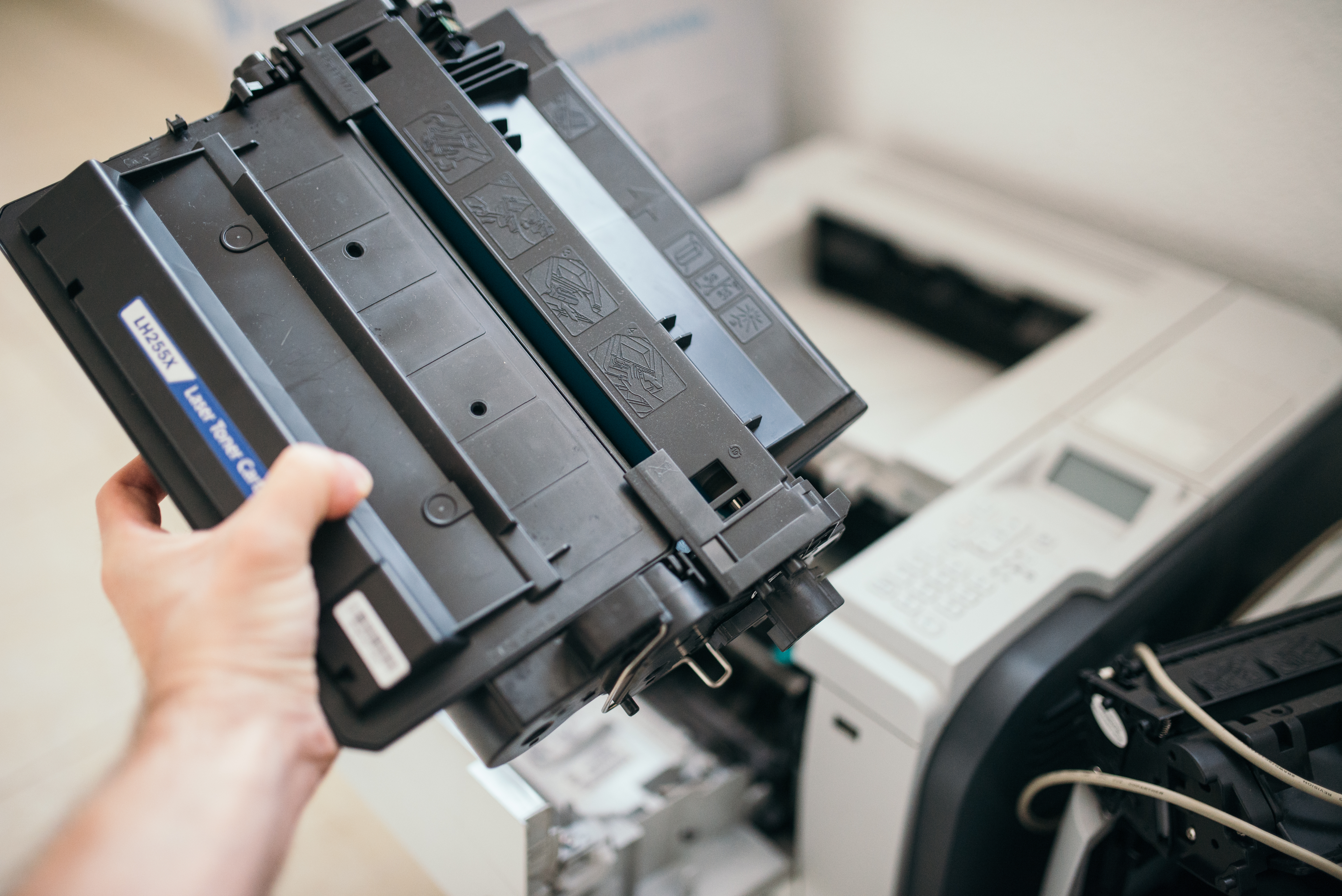
Compatible toner cartridge for HP LaserJet printers

Compatible ink (or compatible toner) is manufactured by third-party manufacturers and is designed to work in designated printers without infringing on patents of printer manufacturers. Compatible inks and toners may come in a variety of packaging including sealed plastic wraps or taped plastic wraps. Regardless of packaging, compatible products are generally priced lower than original equipment manufacturer (OEM) brand inks and toners.

While there has been considerable debate and litigation involving the ink and toner patents of printer manufacturers, third-party manufacturers continue to thrive; the compatible ink market is valued at around $5.85 billion annually.

== Types ==
Compatible ink is manufactured for several types of machines including fax machines, laser printers, inkjet printers, multifunction printers, and copiers. Aside from compatible products, three other sources of consumables are also available to supply these machines, including OEM brand ink and toner, remanufactured toner and ink cartridges, and refilled ink and toner cartridges. Compatible ink manufacturers differentiate their product by using all new parts, whereas other ink replacements recycle used OEM parts. Compatible ink and toner products tend to offer greater value than original, genuine OEM ink and toner cartridges. Reducing cost for the end user, ink and toner manufactured by third-party manufacturers is classified as compatible when consisting of new parts for a third party printer.

== Comparison of performance, quality and reliability ==
The performance of a printer cartridge needs to be measured by parameters like:

- mechanism of printing (toner and ink-jet) which impacts the resolution and print-rate,
- print quality, the percentage of useful pages (standard required e.g. business use) printed by the cartridge.
- page yield (number of pages printed per cartridge)
- printer compatibility etc.

A comparison between OEM and compatible cartridges for a specific printer needs to take into account the above parameters. For example, a remanufactured cartridge may for example be purchased cheaper, but may not print out as many useful pages. Reliability and consistency associated with an OEM cartridge may be more important than price, for example, when printing output for important business.

One independent test in 2004 on using a compatible ink for one type of printer showed little or no difference in quality between the compatible and OEM products.

All types of compatible ink cartridges are different and vary from supplier to supplier. This is due to the type of ink in the printer, the chips (or no chip) on the cartridge and the actual manufacture of the cartridge itself.

In terms of comparisons with suppliers, prices, quality and comparisons with original OEM cartridges. This can vary also by manufacturer and printer. Some compatible cartridges will work perfectly in some printers.

== See also ==
- Vendor lock-in
- Life-cycle assessment
