= Red envelope (disambiguation) =

A red envelope (or hóngbāo) is a monetary gift which is given during special occasions in Chinese and other East Asian societies.

Red envelope may also refer to:

- Red Envelope club, a form of Cabaret in Taiwan
- RedEnvelope, an e-commerce site founded by Scott Galloway (professor) in 1997 as 911Gifts.com
- Red Envelope Entertainment (originally Netflix First) was a film production and distribution arm of Netflix
- WeChat red envelope, a mobile application developed by Chinese technology company Tencent
- "Red envelope", a 2003 single by Dynamite Boy
- "Red envelope", novella by Robert Lopresti, winner of the 2012 Black Orchid Novella Award

== See also ==
- Envelope journalism (also red envelope journalism)
- Green envelope, a Malay adaptation of the Chinese red envelope custom
- Hong Bao (c. 1412–1433), a Chinese eunuch sent on overseas diplomatic missions
