= WeChat =

Chinese multi-purpose mobile app

- Screenshot Screenshot of WeChat on iOS
- Developer: Tencent
- Release: 21 January 2011; 15 years ago

Stable release(s) [±]
- iOS: 8.0.79 / September 28, 2026; 52 days ago
- macOS: 4.1.13 / September 7, 2026; 2 months ago
- Android: 8.0.72 / September 21, 2026; 59 days ago
- Written in: C++, Dart, JavaScript
- Engine: Qt, Flutter, ArkUI
- Operating system: Android, iOS, macOS, Windows, Windows Phone, watchOS, Wear OS, HarmonyOS NEXT
- Platform: IA-32, x86-64, ARM, LoongArch
- Service name: WeChat; Weixin (China mainland)
- Available in: 17 languages
- List of languages Simplified Chinese, Traditional Chinese, Japanese, Korean, English, French, German, Italian, Spanish, Portuguese, Russian, Indonesian, Malay, Thai, Vietnamese, Arabic, Turkish
- Type: Instant messaging client
- License: Proprietary freeware
- Website: wechat.com

Weixin
- Chinese: 微信
Transcriptions
Standard Mandarin
- Hanyu Pinyin: Wēixìn
- Bopomofo: ㄨㄟ ㄒㄧㄣˋ
- Wade–Giles: Wei^{1}-hsin^{4}
- Tongyong Pinyin: Wei-sìn
- IPA: [wéɪ.ɕîn]

WeChat (Chinese: 微信; pinyin: Wēixìn ; lit. 'micro-message') is an instant messaging, social media, and mobile payment app developed by Tencent. First released in 2011, it became the world's largest standalone mobile app in 2018 with over 1 billion monthly active users. WeChat has been described as China's "app for everything" and a super-app because of its wide range of functions. WeChat provides text messaging, hold-to-talk voice messaging, broadcast (one-to-many) messaging, video conferencing, video games, mobile payment, sharing of photographs and videos and location sharing. It has been described as having "an almost indispensable part of life in China".

To sign up for WeChat, a user may need to provide their bank cards or ask another WeChat user to scan their QR code. Accounts registered with telephone numbers in mainland China store data in mainland China and are governed by Weixin's terms of service and privacy policy. Non-Chinese WeChat users enjoy different, more liberal terms of service and a stricter privacy policy. WeChat users’ personal information (excluding users in mainland China) is stored in Singapore, or in Hong Kong for users in Hong Kong and Macau. WeChat users’ personal information may also be transferred to the Netherlands, Malaysia, and the United States. Personal information of international WeChat accounts can ultimately still be accessed remotely from mainland China by Tencent, and interactions between WeChat and Weixin users are subject to both services' policies. Activities on both versions may be monitored and shared with Chinese authorities on request. WeChat censor politically sensitive topics and ban content deemed threatening to national security, social order, or state policy. Tencent deleted LGBTQ official accounts without warning. Tencent also blocks international WeChat accounts for content considered lewd material, violence, scams, rumors, or false ads. WeChat blocked or censored accounts of Americans and Canadians, many of whom were of Chinese ancestry, discussing Hong Kong. Australian Prime Minister Scott Morrison’s account was also blocked. Account bans can significantly disrupt users' lives in China.

== History ==
By 2010, Tencent had already attained a massive user base with their desktop messenger app QQ. Recognizing smart phones were likely to disrupt this status quo, CEO Pony Ma sought to proactively invest in alternatives to their own QQ messenger app.

WeChat began as a project at Tencent Guangzhou Research and Project center in October 2010. The original version of the app was created by Allen Zhang, named "Weixin" (微信) by Pony Ma, and launched in 2011. The user adoption of WeChat was initially very slow, with users wondering why key features were missing; however, after the release of the Walkie-talkie-like voice messaging feature in May of that year, growth surged. By 2012, when the number of users reached 100 million, Weixin was re-branded "WeChat" by President Martin Lau for the international market.

During a period of government support of e-commerce development—for example in the 12th Five-Year Plan (2011–2015)—WeChat also saw new features enabling payments and commerce in 2013, which saw massive adoption after their virtual Red envelope promotion for Chinese New Year 2014.

WeChat had over 889 million monthly active users by 2016, and as of 2019 WeChat's monthly active users had risen to an estimate of one billion. As of January 2022, it was reported that WeChat has more than 1.2 billion users. After the launch of WeChat payment in 2013, its users reached 400 million the next year, 90 percent of whom were in China. By comparison, Facebook Messenger and WhatsApp had about one billion monthly active users in 2016 but did not offer most of the other services available on WeChat. For example, in Q2 2017, WeChat's revenues from social media advertising were about US$0.9 billion (RMB6 billion) compared with Facebook's total revenues of US$9.3 billion, 98% of which were from social media advertising. WeChat's revenues from its value-added services were US$5.5 billion.

By 2018, WeChat had been used by 93.5% of Chinese internet users. In that year, it became the world's largest standalone mobile app in 2018 with over 1 billion monthly active users.

As of March 2026, WeChat + Weixin has a combined monthly users of 1.432B. From 2018-2021 their monthly users increased about 4.9% a year, and from 2021-2025 their monthly users increased about 2.8% year.

In response to a border dispute between India and China, WeChat was banned in India in June 2020 along with several other Chinese apps, including TikTok. U.S. president Donald Trump sought to ban U.S. "transactions" with WeChat through an executive order but was blocked by a preliminary injunction issued in the United States District Court for the Northern District of California in September 2020. Joe Biden officially dropped Trump's efforts to ban WeChat in the U.S. in June 2021.

=== Logo ===
WeChat Logo in English (2011-2019)

WeChat Logo in English (2019-now)

WeChat Logo in Chinese (2019-now)

== Features ==
WeChat, has been described as China's "app for everything" and a super-app because of its wide range of functions. WeChat provides text messaging, hold-to-talk voice messaging, broadcast (one-to-many) messaging, video conferencing, video games, mobile payment, sharing of photographs and videos and location sharing. It has been described as having "an almost indispensable part of life in China". Due to its central part of Chinese life, a Chinese person having their WeChat account banned can cause a significant disruption to their life.

=== Messaging ===
WeChat provides a variety of features including text messaging, hold-to-talk voice messaging, broadcast (one-to-many) messaging, video calls and conferencing, video games, photograph and video sharing, as well as location sharing. WeChat also allows users to exchange contacts with people nearby via Bluetooth, as well as providing various features for contacting people at random if desired (if people are open to it). It can also integrate with other social networking services such as Facebook and Tencent QQ. Photographs may also be embellished with filters and captions, and automatic translation service is available and could also translate the conversation during messaging.

WeChat provides various instant messaging methods, including text messages, voice messages, walkie talkie, and stickers. Users can send previously saved or live pictures and videos, profiles of other users, coupons, lucky money packages, or current GPS locations with friends either individually or in a group chat.

WeChat also provides a message recall feature to allow users to recall and withdraw information (e.g. images, documents) that are sent within 2 minutes in a conversation.

WeChat also provides a voice-to-text feature for use when it is not convenient to listen to voice messages, as well as the basic ability to recognize emojis based on different tones of voice.

WeChat has a distance sensing feature, in which it activate the receiver's hold-to-talk function when the phone is brought in close proximity to the ear. Moving the device a certain distance from the ear disables the speakers. This feature prevents bystanders from hearing voice messages.

=== Official Accounts ===
WeChat users can register as an official account (公众号), which enables them to push feeds to subscribers, interact with subscribers, and provide subscribers with services. Users can also create an official account, which fall under service, subscription, or enterprise accounts. Once users as individuals or organizations set up a type of account, they cannot change it to another type. By the end of 2014, the number of WeChat official accounts had reached 8 million. Official accounts of organizations can apply to be verified (cost 300 RMB or about US$45). Official accounts can be used as a platform for services such as hospital pre-registrations, or credit card service. To create an official account, the applicant must register with Chinese authorities, which discourages "foreign companies". In April 2022, WeChat announced that it will start displaying the location of users in China every time they post on a public account. Meanwhile, overseas users on public accounts will also display the country based on their IP address.

=== Moments ===
"Moments" (朋友圈) is WeChat's brand name for its social feed of friends' updates. "Moments" is an interactive platform that allows users to post images, text, and short videos taken by users. It also allows users to share articles and music (associated with QQ Music or other web-based music services). Friends in the contact list can like the content and leave comments, functioning similarly to a private social network.

In 2017 WeChat had a policy of a maximum of two advertisements per day per Moments user.

Privacy in WeChat works by groups of friends: only the friends from the user's contact are able to view their Moments' contents and comments. The friends of the user will only be able to see the likes and comments from other users only if they are in a mutual friend group. For example, friends from high school are not able to see the comments and likes from friends from a university. When users post their moments, they can separate their friends into a few groups, and they can decide whether this Moment can be seen by particular groups of people. Contents posted can be set to "Private", and then only the user can view it. Unlike Weibo or Instagram, these are only shared to the user's friends. These are unlikely to go viral.

Recently, WeChat launched a new feature allowing users to pin posts to Moments, so that others can re-watch them, enabling easier tracking of important posts and permanent display of posts.

=== WeChat Pay ===
Users who have provided bank account information may use the app to pay bills, order goods and services, transfer money to other users, and pay in stores if the stores have a WeChat payment option. Vetted third parties, known as "official accounts", offer these services by developing lightweight "apps within the app". Users can link their Chinese bank accounts, as well as Visa, MasterCard and JCB.

WeChat Pay, officially referred to as Weixin Pay (微信支付) in China and WeChat Pay HK in Hong Kong, is a digital wallet service incorporated into WeChat, which allows users to perform mobile payments and send money between contacts.

Although users receive immediate notification of the transaction, WeChat Pay is not an instant payment instrument, because the funds transfer between counterparts is not immediate. The settlement time depends on the payment method chosen by the customer.

All WeChat users have their own WeChat Pay accounts. Users can acquire a balance by linking their WeChat account to their debit cards, or by receiving money from other users. For non-Chinese users of Weixin Pay, an additional identity verification process of providing a photo of a valid ID is required before certain functions of Weixin Pay become available. Users who link their credit card can only make payments to vendors, and cannot use this to top up WeChat balances. WeChat Pay can be used for digital payments, as well as payments from participating vendors. As of March 2016, WeChat Pay had over 300 million users.

WeChat Pay's main competitor in China and the market leader in online payments is Alibaba Group's Alipay. Alibaba company founder Jack Ma considered WeChat red envelope to be a "Pearl Harbor moment", as it began to erode Alipay's historic dominance in the online payment industry in China, especially in peer-to-peer money transfer.The success prompted Alibaba to launch its own version of virtual red envelopes in its competing Laiwang service. Other competitors, Baidu Wallet and Sina Weibo, also launched similar features. What was called the 'Red Envelope War', resulted in 16 million red envelopes being sent in 2014 which grew to 1 billion the following year. Tencent even introduced a new aspect to the red envelope gimmick by allowing users to distribute an allocated sum of money among friends on a first-come, first-served basis, resulting in customers frequently checking the WeChat application. Alibaba that owns Tmall, Taobao, and Alibaba's e-commerce sites, collaborated with more than 40 sponsors to give away US$123 million to users who participated in its own interactive game during a New Years Gala Show sponsored by China Central Television. They also introduced a 'Lucky Card Collection' game that allowed users to collect and exchange cards to become eligible to win cash prizes. By adding 10 friends to Alipay users could get three cards that went towards the five virtual cards needed to get a share in the US$33 million. The rivalry continued into 2016 when WeChat sent 8 billion hongbao using the application and blocked WeChat users from sharing Alipay red envelopes with their friends through WeChat.

In 2019 it was reported that WeChat had overtaken Alibaba with 800 million active WeChat mobile payment users versus 520 million for Alibaba's Alipay. However Alibaba had a 54 per cent share of the Chinese mobile online payments market in 2017 compared to WeChat's 37 per cent share. In the same year, Tencent introduced "WeChat Pay HK", a payment service for users in Hong Kong. Transactions are carried out with the Hong Kong dollar. In 2019 it was reported that Chinese users can use WeChat Pay in 25 countries outside China, including, Italy, South Africa and the UK. WeChat is more of a messaging and social application that offers users a one-time solution for engagement through chats and direct purchases. It promotes community builiding and more one to one engagement. Alibaba's in September 2024 announced that Taobao and Tmall would accept WeChat Pay as a form of payment for online purchases. This allowed people who were used Taobao to pay through WeChat Pay without using the application making a lot easier and faster to make purchases.

=== WeCom ===
For work purposes, companies and business communication, a special version of WeChat called WeCom (formally known as Enterprise WeChat (or Qiye Weixin) and WeChat Work before Nov 2020) was launched in 2016. The app was meant to help employees separate work from private life. In addition to the usual chat features, the program let companies and their employees keep track of annual leave days and expenses that need to be reimbursed, employees could ask for time off or clock in to show they were at work.

=== Mini Programs ===
In 2017, WeChat launched a feature called "Mini Programs" (小程序). A mini program is an app within an app. Business owners can create mini apps in the WeChat system, implemented using proprietary versions of CSS, JavaScript, and templated XML JavaScript with proprietary APIs. Users may install these inside the WeChat app. In January 2018, WeChat announced a record of 580,000 mini programs. With one Mini Program, consumers could scan the Quick Response code using their mobile phone at a supermarket counter and pay the bill through the user's WeChat mobile wallet. WeChat Games have received huge popularity, with its "Jump Jump" game attracting 400 million players in less than 3 days and attaining 100 million daily active users in just two weeks after its launch, as of January 2018. Ever since WeChat Mini Program's Launch, the daily active user count of WeChat Mini Programs are increasing dramatically. In 2017, there were only 160 million daily active users, however, the number reached 450 million in 2021.

=== WeChat Channels ===
In 2020, WeChat Channels were launched. They are a short video platform within WeChat that allows users to create and share short video clips and photos to their own WeChat Channel. Users of Channels can also discover content posted to other Channels by others via the in-built feed. Each post can include hashtags, a location tag, a short description, and a link to an WeChat official account article. In September 2021, it was reported that WeChat Channels began allowing users to upload hour-long videos, twice of the duration limit previously imposed on all WeChat Channels videos. Comparisons are often drawn between WeChat Channels and TikTok (or Douyin) for their similarity in features.

In January 2022, there were reports that WeChat is set to diversify further and place more emphasis on new products and services like WeChat Channels, amid new regulatory restrictions imposed in China.

By June 2021, WeChat Channels had accumulated over 200 million users, and WeChat Channels have 500 million DAU (Daily Active Users), growing at 79% year-on -year. More than 27 million people had used the platform to watch Irish boy band Westlife's online concert in 2021, and 15 million users also viewed the Shenzhou 12 spaceflight launch using the app service.

=== Easy Mode ===
In September 2021, WeChat introduced a brand-new feature on its platform called Easy Mode. It was mainly designed for elderly people with higher readability by providing a larger font size, sharper colours, and bigger buttons. Another feature provided in this update was the ability to listen to text messages. Easy Mode was released in version 8.0.14 for both iOS and Android.

=== Guardian Mode ===
Guardian Mode is a function in WeChat for protecting users under 14 years old. It was introduced to promote safety and provide security environment for WeChat users. After operating the Guardian Mode, the functions of "people nearby", "games", "search" will not be accessible in the interface. The channels function in WeChat, a video mini program, would only show contents suitable for adolescents. Additionally, WeChat users who turn on the Guardian Mode are only able to add friends through QR codes and group chats. Moreover, WeChat users would only be able to view 10 latest Moments posts and would not be able to view the 10 latest Moments posts of non-friend users under the privacy setting of Guardian Mode.

=== Others ===
In January 2016, Tencent launched WeChat Out, a VOIP service allowing users to call mobile phones and landlines around the world. The feature allowed purchasing credit within the app using a credit card. WeChat Out was originally only available in the United States, India, and Hong Kong, but later coverage was expanded to Thailand, Macau, Laos, and Italy.

In March 2017, Tencent released WeChat Index. By inserting a search term in the WeChat Index page, users could check the popularity of this term in the past 7, 30, or 90 days. The data was mined from data in official WeChat accounts and metrics such as social sharing, likes and reads were used in the evaluation.

In May 2017, Tencent started news feed and search functions for its WeChat app. The Financial Times reported this was a "direct challenge to Chinese search engine Baidu".

In 2017, WeChat was reported to be developing an augmented reality (AR) platform as part of its service offering. Its artificial intelligence team was working on a 3D rendering engine to create a realistic appearance of detailed objects in smartphone-based AR apps. They were also developing a simultaneous localization and mapping technology, which would help calculate the position of virtual objects relative to their environment, enabling AR interactions without the need for markers, such as Quick Response codes or special images.

Chinese courts allow the parties to communicate with the courts via WeChat, through which parties can file lawsuits, participate in proceedings, present evidence, and listen to verdicts. As of December 2019, more than 3 million parties had used WeChat for litigation.

In spring 2020, WeChat users are now able to change their WeChat ID more than once, being allowed to change their username only once per year. Prior to this, a WeChat ID could not be changed more than once.

On 17 June 2020, WeChat released a new add-on called "WeChat Nudge". The feature was first introduced in MSN Messenger 7.0, in 2005. The feature was called Buzz in Yahoo! Messenger and the feature had interoperability with MSN Messenger's Nudge. Similar to Messenger and Yahoo, users can access WeChat Nudge by double-clicking on other users' profiles in the chat. This virtually shakes user's profile photo and sends a vibration notification. Both users must have the latest Wechat update. If a user does not have the latest update they will be unable to nudge another user, but can still receive nudges. A user can only nudge another user if they have previous conversations. Newly added friends without previous messages cannot nudge each other.

On 16 January 2022, a new version of WeChat has added seven major functions for the iOS 8.0.17, Android 8.0.18 or newer version users. In the function of Personal Information Authority, users can check the number of times personal information has been edited in the past year through the personal information collection list, including head portrait, name, mobile number, gender, region, personalized signature, and address.

On 30 March 2022, according to the relevant laws and regulations of China, in order to prevent the risk of publicity stunts in virtual currency transactions, the Wechat public platform standardized the official account and mini program of secondary sales of digital collections.

== WeChat Business ==
WeChat Business (微商) is one of the latest mobile social network business model after e-commerce, which utilizes business relationships and friendships to maintain a customer relationship. Comparing with the traditional E-business like JD.com and Alibaba, WeChat Business has a large range of influence and profits with less input and lower threshold, which attracts lots of people to join in WeChat business.

=== Marketing modes ===
==== B2C Mode ====
This is the main profit mode of WeChat Business. The first one is to launch advertisements and provide services through the WeChat Official Account, which is a B2C mode. This mode has been used by many hospitals, banks, fashion brands, internet companies and personal blogs because the Official Account can access online payment, location sharing, voice messages, and mini-games. It is like a 'mini app', so the company has to hire specific staff to manage the account. By 2015, there were more than 100 million WeChat Official Accounts on this platform.

==== B2B Mode ====
WeChat salesperson in this mode is for promoting products by individuals, which belongs to C2C mode. In this mode, individual sellers post relevant photos and messages of their agent products on the WeChat Moments or WeChat groups and sell products to their WeChat friends. Besides, they develop friendships with their customers by sending messages in festivals or write comments under their updates on WeChat moments to increase their trust. Also, continuing to communicate with the regular customers raises the 'WOF' (word-of-mouth) communications, which influences decision-making. Some WeChat businessmen already have an online shop in Taobao, but use WeChat to maintain existing customers.

=== Existing problems ===
As more and more people have joined WeChat Business, it has brought many problems. For example, some sellers have begun to sell counterfeit luxury goods such as bags, clothes and watches. Some sellers have disguised themselves as international flight attendants or overseas students to post fake stylish photos on WeChat Moments. They then claim that they can provide overseas purchasing services but sell counterfeit luxury goods at the same price as the authentic ones. Other popular products selling on WeChat are facial masks. The marketing mode is like that of Amway but most goods are unbranded products which come from illegal factories making excess hormones which could have serious effects on customers' health. However, it is difficult for customers to defend their rights because a large number of sellers' identities are uncertified. Additionally, the lack of any supervision mechanism in WeChat business also provides opportunities for criminals to continue this illegal behavior. In early 2022, WeChat suspended more than a dozen NFT (non-fungible token) public accounts to clean up crypto speculation and scalping. The crackdown on NFT-related content comes from domestic digital collectibles, which cannot be resold for profit.

== Marketing ==
=== Campaigns ===
In a 2016 campaign, users could upload a paid photo on "Moments" and other users could pay to see the photo and comment on it. The photos were taken down each night.

=== Collaborations ===
In 2014, Burberry partnered with WeChat to create its own WeChat apps around its fall 2014 runway show, giving users live streams from the shows. Another brand, Michael Kors used WeChat to give live updates from their runway show, and later to run a photo contest "Chic Together WeChat campaign".

In 2016, L'Oréal China cooperated with Papi Jiang to promote their products. Over one million people watched her first video promoting L'Oreal's beauty brand MG.

In 2016, WeChat partnered with 60 Italian companies (WeChat had an office in Milan) who were able to sell their products and services on the Chinese market without having to get a license to operate a business in China. In 2017, Andrea Ghizzoni, European director of Tencent, said that 95 percent of global luxury brands used WeChat.

In 2020 Burberry and WeChat collaborated to design a shop in Shenzhen where Burberry has a flagship store, as well as an app allowing shoppers to interact with the shop digitally.

=== WeChat marketing tactics ===
There are a number of main marketing tactics employed in WeChat.

- Content Marketing - publishing company posts and news through Official Accounts. These stories can be shared to groups and on Moments.
- Influencer Marketing - collaborating with influencers or influential WeChat platforms to promote goods and services. WeChat has its own influencer platform.
- WeChat media - most media platforms have accounts on WeChat and can promote their news or products through PR or collaboration
- Paid advertising - WeChat has an advertising platform for image and video promotion through Moments or embedded in posts

== Platforms ==
WeChat's mobile phone app is available only for Android, HarmonyOS and iOS. Previously, it also worked on BlackBerry, Windows Phone, and Symbian phones. It stopped working on Windows Phone on 22 September 2017. The company ceased the development of the app for Windows Phones before the end of 2017. Although Web-based OS X and Windows clients exist, this requires the user to have the app installed on a supported mobile phone for authentication, and neither message roaming nor 'Moments' are provided. Thus, without the app on a supported phone, it is not possible to use the web-based WeChat clients on the computer.

The company also provides WeChat for Web, a web-based client with messaging and file transfer capabilities. Other functions cannot be used on it, such as the detection of nearby people, or interacting with Moments or Official Accounts. To use the Web-based client, it is necessary to first scan a QR code using the phone app. This means it is not possible to access the WeChat network if a user does not possess a suitable smartphone with the app installed.

WeChat could be accessed on Windows using BlueStacks until December 2014. After that, WeChat blocked Android emulators and accounts that have signed in from emulators may be frozen.

There have been some reported issues with the Web client. Specifically when using English, some users have experienced autocorrect, autocomplete, auto-capitalization, and auto-delete behavior as they type messages and even after the message was sent. For example, "gonna" was autocorrected to "go", the E's were auto-deleted in "need", "wechat" was auto-capitalized to "Wechat" but not "WeChat", and after the message was sent, "don't" got auto-corrected to "do not". However, the auto-corrected word(s) after the message was sent appeared on the phone app as the user had originally typed it ("don't" was seen on the phone app whereas "do not" was seen on the Web client). Users could translate a foreign language during a conversation and the words were posted on Moments.

WeChat allows group video calls.

== Controversies ==
=== State surveillance and intelligence gathering ===
WeChat operates from China under Chinese law, which includes strong censorship provisions and interception protocols. Its parent company Tencent is obliged to share data with the Chinese government under the China Internet Security Law and National Intelligence Law. WeChat can access and expose the text messages, address book, and location histories of its users. Due to the popularity of WeChat, the Chinese government uses WeChat as a data source to conduct mass surveillance in China.

Some states and regions such as India, Australia, the United States, and Taiwan fear that the app poses a threat to national security for various reasons. In June 2013, the Indian Intelligence Bureau flagged WeChat for security concerns. India has debated whether or not they should ban WeChat for the possibility that too much personal information and data could be collected from its users. In Taiwan, legislators were concerned that the potential exposure of private communications was a threat to regional security.

In 2016, Tencent was awarded a score of zero out of 100 in an Amnesty International report ranking technology companies on the way they implement encryption to protect the human rights of their users. The report placed Tencent last out of a total of 11 companies, including Facebook, Apple, and Google, for the lack of privacy protections built into WeChat and QQ. The report found that Tencent did not make use of end-to-end encryption, which is a system that allows only the communicating users to read the messages. It also found that Tencent did not recognize online threats to human rights, did not disclose government requests for data, and did not publish specific data about its use of encryption.

A September 2017 update to the platform's privacy policy detailed that log data collected by WeChat included search terms, profiles visited, and content that had been viewed within the app. Additionally, metadata related to the communications between Weixin users—including call times, duration, and location information—was also collected. This information, which was used by Tencent for targeted advertising and marketing purposes, might be disclosed to representatives of the Chinese government:

1. To comply with an applicable law or regulations.
2. To comply with a court order, subpoena, or other legal process.
3. In response to a request by a government authority, law enforcement agency, or similar body.

In May 2020, Citizen Lab published a study which claimed that WeChat monitors foreign chats to hone its censorship algorithms.

On 14 August 2020, Radio Free Asia reported that in 2019, Gao Zhigang, a citizen of Taiyuan city, Shanxi Province, China, used WeChat to forward a video to his friend Geng Guanjun in USA. Gao was later convicted on the charge of the crime of picking quarrels and provoking trouble, and sentenced to ten-months imprisonment. The Court documents show that China's network management and propaganda departments directly monitor WeChat users, and the Chinese police used big data facial technology to identify Geng Guanjun as an overseas democracy activist.

In 2020, Chinese police dragged Joanne Li from her house, manacled her to a chair, and interrogated her for three days for sending a news link on WeChat.

In September 2020, Chevron Corporation mandated that its employees delete WeChat from company-issued phones.

=== Privacy issues ===
Users inside and outside of China also have expressed concern about the privacy issues of the app. Human rights activist Hu Jia was jailed for three years for sedition. He speculated that the officials of the Internal Security Bureau of the Ministry of Public Security listened to his voicemail messages that were directed to his friends, repeating the words displayed within the voice mail messages to Hu. Chinese authorities have further accused the WeChat app of threatening individual safety. China Central Television (CCTV), a state-run broadcaster, featured a piece in which WeChat was described as an app that helped criminals due to its location-reporting features. CCTV gave an example of such accusations through reporting the murder of a single woman who, after he attempted to rob her, was murdered by a man she met on Weixin. The location-reporting feature, according to reports, was the reason for the man knowing the victim's whereabouts. Authorities within China have linked WeChat to numerous crimes. The city of Hangzhou, for example, reported over twenty crimes related to WeChat in the span of three months.

=== XcodeGhost malware ===
In 2015, Apple published a list of the top 25 most popular apps infected with the XcodeGhost malware, confirming earlier reports that version 6.2.5 of WeChat for iOS was infected with it. The malware originated in a counterfeit version of Xcode (dubbed "XcodeGhost"), Apple's software development tools, and made its way into the compiled app through a modified framework. Despite Apple's review process, WeChat and other infected apps were approved and distributed through the App Store. Even though the cybersecurity company Palo Alto Networks claims that the malware was capable of prompting the user for their account credentials, opening URLs and reading the device's clipboard, Apple responded that the malware was not capable of doing "anything malicious" or transmitting any personally identifiable information beyond "apps and general system information" and that it had no information that suggested that this had happened. In 2015 internet security company Malwarebytes considered this to be the largest security breach in the App Store's history.

=== Ban in India ===
In June 2020, the Government of India banned WeChat along with 58 other Chinese apps citing data and privacy issues, in response to a border clash between India and China earlier in the year. The banned Chinese apps were "stealing and surreptitiously transmitting users’ data in an unauthorized manner to servers which have locations outside India," and was "hostile to national security and defense of India", claimed India's Ministry of Electronics and Information Technology.

=== Previous ban in Russia ===
On 6 May 2017, Russia blocked access to WeChat for failing to give its contact details to the Russian communications watchdog. The ban was swiftly lifted on 11 May 2017 after Tencent provided "relevant information" for registration to Roskomnadzor.

In March 2023, Russia banned government officials from using messaging apps operated by foreign companies, including WeChat.

=== Ban and injunction against ban in the United States ===
On 6 August 2020, U.S. President Donald Trump signed an executive order, invoking the International Emergency Economic Powers Act, seeking to ban WeChat in the U.S. in 45 days, due to its connections with the Chinese-owned Tencent. This was signed alongside a similar executive order targeting TikTok and its Chinese-owned ByteDance.

The Department of Commerce issued orders on 18 September 2020, to enact the ban on WeChat and TikTok by the end of 20 September 2020, citing national security and data privacy concerns. The measures ban the transferring of funds or processing through WeChat in the U.S. and ban any company from offering hosting, content delivery networks or internet transit to WeChat.

Magistrate Judge Laurel Beeler of the United States District Court for the Northern District of California issued a preliminary injunction blocking the Department of Commerce order on both TikTok and WeChat on 20 September 2020, based on respective lawsuits filed by TikTok and US WeChat Users Alliance, citing the merits of the plaintiffs' First Amendment claims. The Justice Department had previously asked Beeler to not block the order to ban the apps saying it would undermine the president's ability to deal with threats to national security. In her ruling, Beeler said that while the government had established that Chinese government activities raised significant national security concerns, it showed little evidence that the WeChat ban would address those concerns.

On 9 June 2021, U.S. President Joe Biden signed an executive order revoking the ban on WeChat and TikTok. Instead, he directed the commerce secretary to investigate foreign influence enacted through the apps.

Montana banned the installation of WeChat on government devices since 1 June 2023.

=== Facilitation of drug money laundering ===
In March 2026, as part of a pressure campaign by U.S. state attorneys general to disrupt drug money laundering on the app, WeChat, but not Weixin, agreed to respond to U.S. law enforcement requests within 48 hours. The attorneys general of North Carolina, South Carolina, Colorado, Kentucky, New Hampshire and New Jersey subsequently asked the Trump administration to take action against WeChat.

=== Partial ban in Canada ===
In October 2023, Canada banned WeChat on all government devices.

=== Notorious Markets list ===
In 2022, the Office of the United States Trade Representative (USTR) added WeChat's ecommerce ecosystem to its list of Notorious Markets for Counterfeiting and Piracy. In January 2025, USTR removed WeChat from its list of notorious markets.

=== 2023 Australian Indigenous Voice referendum ===
In the lead-up to the 2023 Australian Indigenous Voice referendum, an unsuccessful attempt to enshrine an Indigenous Voice to Parliament in the Constitution, WeChat and other popular Chinese social media platforms were criticised by both Yes and No supporters and by both Chinese and non-Chinese Australians for its excessive amount of misleading content about the referendum, as well as its excessive amount of posts that allegedly promote anti-Indigenous racism. Researchers from Monash University in Melbourne found that less than one in 10 WeChat posts related to the referendum were supportive of the Yes case, most of which were paid advertisements from the official Yes campaign. The study also found that the vast majority of comments on Voice-related WeChat posts were explicitly supportive of the No case.

Chinese Australians are a very large minority group in Australia, with many using WeChat as a social media platform. While the usage of Chinese apps such as WeChat in Australia has long been controversial over its potential links to the Chinese government, but it nevertheless is seen as a major social media platform in Australia, directly competing with Western platforms among Chinese speakers in Australia. As voting is compulsory for all Australian citizens over the age of 18, social media advertising is crucial for election campaigns in Australia. Therefore, the significance of the number of No campaign material, some of which even contained misinformation that most No supporters do not agree with, had the potential to sway the votes of Chinese Australians towards the ultimately successful No case.

=== Differences between WeChat and Weixin ===
WeChat is the international version registered with international phone numbers, whereas Weixin is the Chinese version tied to Chinese phone numbers. The two share the same .ipa files on iPhone App Store and are interconnected, enabling users to communicate directly across geographical boundaries. Operated by different Tencent subsidiaries, they provide interoperable services including chatting, VOIP calls, Moments, and payment features. Because of regional legal requirements, Weixin users are subject to the "Weixin Terms," while WeChat users are subject to the "WeChat Terms." During cross-platform interactions, users are mutually bound by the counterpart's terms, and shared information is processed and stored accordingly. Feature-wise, WeChat exclusively offers WeChat Out. Channels and Game Center (both in certain regions), Kids Watch, and Voiceprint (excluding the EU/EEA, North America, and the UK) are Weixin features.

=== Canadian election interference ===
In April 2025 Canadian intelligence officials claimed that the most popular news account on WeChat, Youli-Youmian, had been used for an information operation against the upcoming Canadian elections. Canadian intelligence linked the operation to China's Central Political and Legal Affairs Commission. The operation targeted Liberal Leader Mark Carney.

=== Ban in Nepal ===
In September 2025, the Government of Nepal banned 26 social media platforms, including WeChat, after the platforms failed to comply with new registration requirements in regard to a new law regulating social media in Nepal. Following the ban, representatives of WeChat have stated their interest in registering with the law but have yet to file an application for the process. The ban was lifted following the 2025 Nepalese Gen Z protests.

== Censorship ==
=== Global censorship ===
Starting in 2013, reports arose that Chinese-language searches even outside China were being keyword filtered and then blocked. This occurred on incoming traffic to China from foreign countries but also exclusively between foreign parties (the service had already censored its communications within China). In the international example of blocking, a message was displayed on users' screens: "The message "南方周末" your message contains restricted words. Please check it again." These are the Chinese characters for a Guangzhou-based paper called Southern Weekly (or, alternatively, Southern Weekend). The next day Tencent released a statement addressing the issue saying "A small number of WeChat international users were not able to send certain messages due to a technical glitch this Thursday. Immediate actions have been taken to rectify it. We apologize for any inconvenience it has caused to our users. We will continue to improve the product features and technological support to provide a better user experience." Tencent eventually built two different versions to avoid this problem; one for China (Weixin) and one for the rest of the world (WeChat). The problem existed because WeChat's servers were all located in China and thus subjected to its censorship rules.

Following the overwhelming victory of pro-democracy candidates in the 2019 Hong Kong local elections Tencent censored WeChat messages related to the election and disabled accounts of posters in other countries such as U.S. and Canada. Many of those targeted were Chinese Americans.

In 2020, Tencent started censoring WeChat messages concerning the COVID-19 pandemic.

In December 2020 Tencent blocked a post by Australian Prime Minister Scott Morrison during a diplomatic spat between Australia and China. In his WeChat Official Account post Morrison had criticized a doctored image posted by a Chinese diplomat and praised the Chinese-Australian community. According to Reuters the company claimed to have blocked the post for "violated regulations, including distorting historical events and confusing the public."

=== Two censorship systems ===
In 2016, the Citizen Lab published a report saying that WeChat was using different censorship policies in mainland China and other areas. They found that:

1. Keyword filtering was only enabled for users who registered via phone numbers from mainland China;
2. Users did not get notices anymore when messages are blocked;
3. Filtering was more strict on group chat;
4. Keywords were not static. Some newfound censored keywords were in response to current news events;
5. The Internal browser in WeChat blocked Chinese accounts from accessing some websites such as gambling, Falun Gong and critical reports on China. International users were not blocked except for accessing some gambling and pornography websites.

Later, WeChat was split into Weixin (the Chinese version) and WeChat (the international version) as described in the previous section, with only Weixin being subject to message censoring. Accounts registered using Chinese phone numbers are now managed under the Weixin brand, and their data is stored in mainland China and subject to Weixin's terms of service and privacy policy, which forbids content which "endanger[s] national security, divulge[s] state secrets, subvert[s] state power and undermine[s] national unity" as well as those that don't adhered to the Seven Bottom Lines. Non-Chinese numbers are registered under WeChat, and WeChat users are subject to a different, less strict terms of service and stricter privacy policy, and their data is stored in Singapore or Hong Kong.

=== Censorship in Iran ===
In September 2013, WeChat was blocked in Iran. The Iranian authorities cited WeChat Nearby (Friend Radar) and the spread of pornographic content as the reason of censorship.

The Committee for Determining Instances of Criminal Content (a working group under the supervision of the attorney general) website FAQ says:

Because WeChat collects phone data and monitors member activity and because app developers are outside of the country and not cooperating, this software has been blocked, so you can use domestic applications for cheap voice calls, video calls and messaging.

On 4 January 2018, WeChat was unblocked in Iran.

=== Crackdown on LGBTQ official accounts ===
On 6 July 2021, several WeChat official accounts associated with China's university campuses LGBTQ movement were blocked and then deleted without warning; the official media said they had no knowledge of this. Some of the accounts, which consisted of a mix of registered student clubs and unofficial grassroots groups had operated for years as safe spaces for China's LGBTQ youth, with tens of thousands of followers. Many of the closed official accounts display messages saying that they had "violated" Internet regulations, without giving further details, with account names being deleted and replaced with "unnamed", with a notice claiming that all content was blocked and accounts were suspended after receiving relevant complaints. The U.S. State Department expressed concern that the accounts were deleted when they were merely expressing their views, exercising their right to freedom of expression and freedom of speech. Several groups that had their accounts deleted spoke out against the ban with one stating "[W]e hope to use this opportunity to start again with a continued focus on gender and society, and to embrace courage and love". In August 2023, immediately prior to the Qixi Festival, Tencent launched a mass closure of official accounts related to LGBT rights and feminism.

== Sources ==
Chen, Ya Rao (2024). "L'impact du covid-19 sur les sujets liés aux personnes âgées : analyse du discours des comptes d'abonnement WeChat". Elad-Silda (10). doi:10.35562/elad-silda.1542.
