= Cartridge World =

Printer cartridge retailer

- Company type: Private
- Industry: Retail, business services franchising
- Founded: 1992 in Adelaide, South Australia, Australia
- Founder: Bryan Stokes
- Headquarters: Sydney, New South Wales, Australia
- Number of locations: 600 stores
- Area served: Worldwide
- Owner: Cartridge World Australia Pty Ltd
- Website: www.cartridgeworldglobal.com

Cartridge World is an Australian retail company that supplies managed print services and ink and toner cartridges for domestic and commercial computer printers.

== Company overview ==
Cartridge World's global headquarters are in Australia.

Cartridge World uses a franchise model to license stores and spaces to provide printer and printing services including supplies, repair, monitoring, leasing, and consultation. In 2023 Cartridge World reported that it had 600 locations in 30 countries.

== History ==
The company was founded in 1992, by Bryan Stokes, as the "Australian Cartridge Company" in Adelaide, and changed its name to Cartridge World in 1999. The first store was franchised in 1997. In August 2007 private equity fund Wolseley Private Equity purchased the business. In February 2001, the first Cartridge World in the United Kingdom was opened in Harrogate, North Yorkshire.

In June 2015, Cartridge World was acquired by Suzhou Goldengreen Technologies Ltd. In June 2016, Cartridge World Global CEO, Steve Weedon, announced a strategic partnership with Samsung, to offer mobile print and scanning services worldwide.

Mark Pinner was appointed as Global Chief Technical Officer and CEO of Cartridge World North America and Edwin Lui, previously General Manager Cartridge World Asia and Middle East, was appointed as Global Chief Financial Officer.

In December 2019, Cartridge World North America completed a USA License deal with USA private equity firm Blackford Capital Private Equity.

In January 2020, Edwin Lui, who had held several positions in the company, was promoted to Global Chief Executive Officer.

As of 2024, only 7 stores remain in the UK from a peak of nearly 300.
