= Toner cartridge =

Consumable component of a laser printer

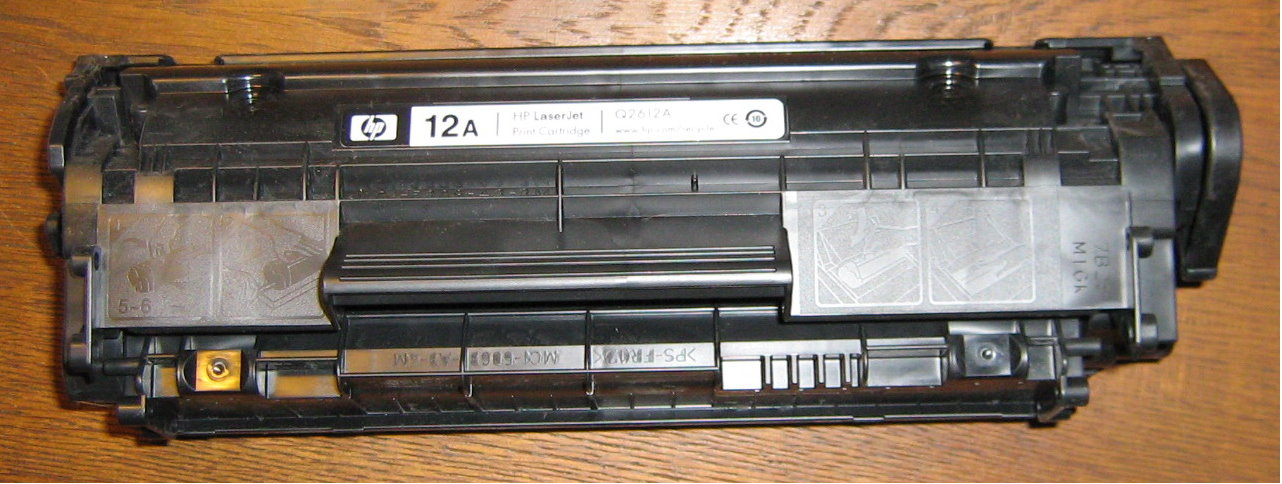
A Hewlett-Packard laser toner cartridge

A toner cartridge, also called laser toner, is the consumable component of a laser printer. Toner cartridges contain toner powder, a fine, dry mixture of plastic particles, carbon, and black or other coloring agents that make the actual image on the paper. The toner is transferred to paper via an electrostatically charged drum unit, and fused onto the paper by heated rollers during the printing process. It will not stain like ink cartridges, but it can get messy if handled improperly.

== Variants ==
Low-end to mid-range laser printers typically contain two consumable parts: the toner cartridge itself (which has a typical life of 2,000 pages) and the drum unit (a typical life of 40,000 pages). Some toner cartridges incorporate the drum unit in the design, and both drum and cartridge are replaced simultaneously; cost of a cartridge is higher than a toner-only cartridge, although separate drum replacement is avoided. Toner cartridges have the same function as ink cartridges used by inkjet printers.

== Price ==
The price of printer manufacturers' toner cartridges for the cheapest laser printers can exceed the cost of the printer. These cheap printers often come with cartridges containing much less toner than the standard cartridge, quickly requiring replacement. Many companies make generic replacement toner cartridges, sold at much lower prices than the original cartridges. The cartridges may be new or remanufactured (refilled), and the quality varies. There are also toner refill kits, allowing the user to refill an empty cartridge.

== Yield ==
Page yield is the number of pages that can be printed with a cartridge. Estimated yield is a number published by manufacturers to provide consumers with an idea of how many pages they can expect from a cartridge. For many years, manufacturers developed their own methods for testing and reporting the yields of their toner cartridges, making it difficult for customers to compare products. Most manufacturers estimate the life of the cartridges at a toner coverage of 5% of the page.

In June 2004, the International Organization for Standardization (ISO), in conjunction with the International Electrotechnical Commission (IEC), published the ISO/IEC 19752 yield standard for monochrome toner cartridges. This was followed in December 2006 by new standards for color inkjet cartridges (ISO/IEC 24711) and color toner cartridges (ISO/IEC 19798).

ISO yield may differ considerably from user experience, proportionally to the difference between the real use of the printer and ISO standard test pages and conditions.

== Smart chips ==
Similar to inkjet printers, toner cartridges may contain smart chips that reduce the number of pages that can be printed with it (reducing the amount of usable ink or toner in the cartridge to sometimes only 50%), in an effort to increase sales of the toner cartridges. Besides being more expensive for printer users, this technique also increases waste, and thus increases pressure on the environment. For these toner cartridges (as with inkjet cartridges), reset devices can be used to override the limitation set by the smart chip. Also, for some printers, online walk-throughs have been posted to demonstrate how to use up all the ink in the cartridge. These chips offer no benefit to the end-user—some laser printers used an optical mechanism to assess the amount of remaining toner in the cartridge rather than using a chip to electrically count the number of printed pages, and the chip's only function was as an alternate method to decrease the cartridge's usable life.

== Cartridge types ==
=== OEM ===
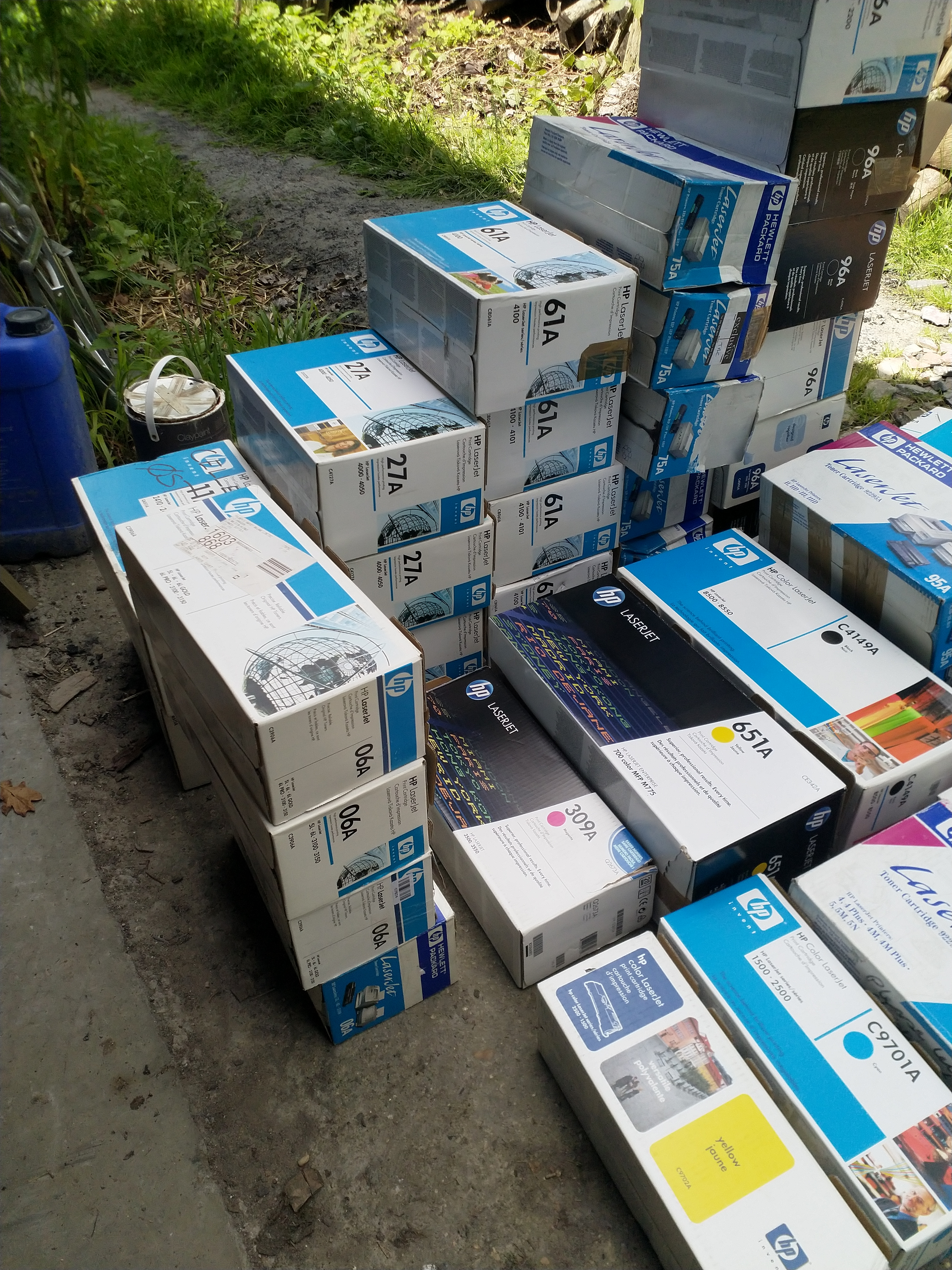
Boxes with OEM toner cartridges for HP LaserJet printers

Cartridges made by the printer manufacturer are referred to by brandname or as "original equipment manufacturer" (OEM); they are often described as "genuine". Manufacturers warn about the poor quality of third-party cartridges—which their suppliers deny—sometimes stating that their use will void the printer warranty.

OEM toner cartridges are more expensive than refilled, compatible, or re-manufactured cartridges.

=== Compatible ===
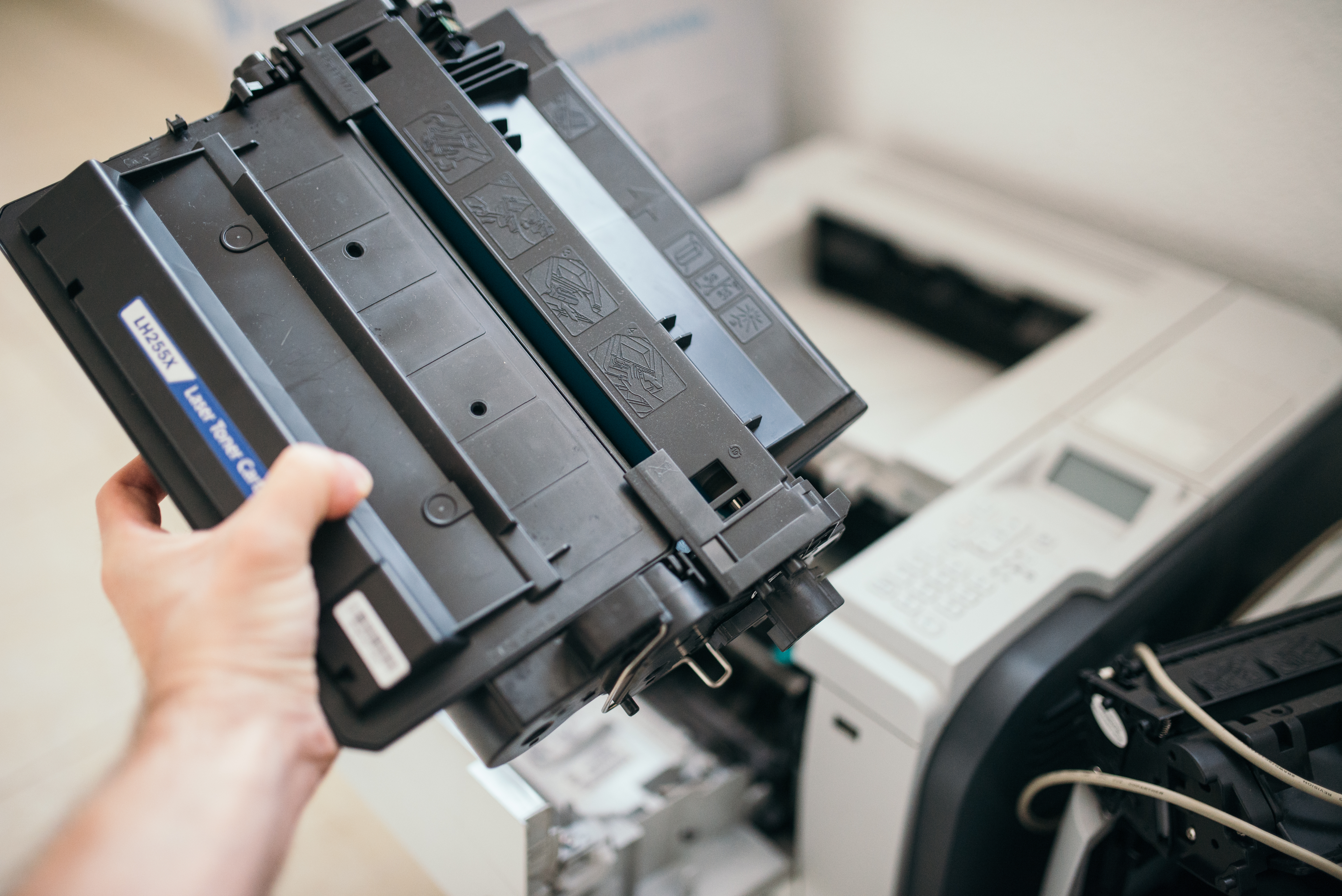
Compatible toner cartridge for HP LaserJet printers

"Compatible", "generic", or "alternative brand" are cartridges manufactured by third party companies and sold under different brand names. Compatible cartridges may vary slightly in look, design and page yield to their OEM counterparts, sometimes due to patents or design copyrights. Generic cartridges are cheaper, often significantly so, than original manufacturer cartridges. They may be less reliable, depending upon the manufacturer. Some contain more toner than OEM cartridges, printing more pages. Some compatible toner cartridges may be of similar quality to their OEM competitors, but many are not.

Problems with compatible toners may be caused by various factors including different melting points, different electrostatic qualities, different pigments and different particle sizes, any of which can lead to poor print quality, dirty background or in extreme cases, damage to equipment.

=== Remanufactured ===
Remanufacturing is, at least, refilling a cartridge with toner. The term implies that the cartridge is also refurbished, with worn or damaged parts replaced. The remanufacturing process, and the quality of the toner, differs between remanufacturers. A poorly remanufactured (or newly manufactured) cartridge may leak, malfunction, or damage the printer. Printer manufacturers use a toner designed to be suitable for their printers; remanufactured and third-party cartridges may use a generic toner which is less well matched.

While toner cartridges are commonly refilled with results reported to be good, in at least some cases this may leave waste toner from each print and paper debris in the cartridge, potentially causing backgrounding problems and producing contamination in the refilled cartridge.

On March 28, 1989, Fred Keen was granted a United States Patent for the "Refillable Toner Cartridge."

== Availability ==
Remanufactured, compatible, OEM and refilled toner cartridges are available from a variety of sources across the world. While compatible and OEM cartridges can be purchased off-the-shelf, smaller remanufacturers may refill an empty cartridge supplied by a customer. Larger remanufacturers used to collect old, empty and unused cartridges for recycling but nowadays they manufacturer theirs. On average, up to 90% of components from old cartridges can be salvaged and used in remanufactured cartridges, while the other 10% is broken down for recycling. Remanufacturers will put together countless cartridges (OEM and compatible) and sell to the retail market at discounted rates.

== Sustainability ==
Each brand new toner cartridge requires the burning of over 2 US quarts (190 cl) of petroleum in the manufacturing process. In North America alone, more than 200 million litres of petroleum are used to sustain the production of new toner cartridges with the majority of these cartridges ending up in the world's landfills once empty. Manufactures have responded by developing recycling programs for their used cartridges.

Advocates of more environmentally friendly processes claim that using refilled and remanufactured toner cartridges are much more environmentally friendly than using brand name new cartridges. Refilled and remanufactured cartridges reduce the dependency on petroleum that otherwise would have been used in the manufacture process of the new cartridge. Advocates also claim that the recycling programs devised by manufacturers are not always as environmentally friendly as consumers might think or in comparison to other options that may be available.

== See also ==
- Ink cartridge
- Compatible ink
- Toner refill
- Inkjet printing
- Pull printing
