= Under cover removal =

Under cover removal, or UCR, is a method for colour printers to use less ink. Black ink is used for grey colours instead of the three CMY inks.
