= WeChat red envelope =

Mobile application developed by Tencent

WeChat red envelope (or WeChat red packet) is a mobile application developed by the Chinese technology company Tencent. The concept, also offered by its market competitors Alibaba and Baidu, is based on the Chinese tradition of hongbao (red envelope, or red packet), where money is given to family and friends as a gift. The application was launched by Tencent in January 2014 and has subsequently gained popularity, with Tencent reporting 2.3 billion transactions on 1 January 2016 alone.

The application offers users the ability to give monetary gifts in the form of virtual "credits" to other users of the application. Money is deposited into a user's WeChat Pay account, which can be used for purchases. The app allows withdrawals from that account. There are two types of "red envelopes" offered by the app: pairwise red packets, in which money is sent in a private chat of two users, and group red packets, in which money is distributed in a group chat. With the latter, after it is posted, the amount of money within is randomly split and assigned to recipients in the group chat.

Since WeChat launched its virtual red envelope campaign in 2014, WeChat Pay has more than doubled its market share.

== Timeline ==
- In June 2013, WeChat first enabled mobile payment on its platform.
- On 17 January 2014, WeChat launched the red envelope application.
- Between August 2014 and January 2015, the application underwent development.
- In February 2015, WeChat distributed 500 million red envelopes full of cash and another three billion virtual coupons to its users.
- On 18 February 2015, WeChat cooperated with CCTV Spring Festival Gala, the most-watched TV show of the year.

== Phenomenon ==
=== "Shake your Booty" ===
In 2014, WeChat partnered with the Spring Festival Gala and introduced the WeChat red envelope shake. During the gala, users were invited to shake their smartphones for a chance to win red envelopes. A total of 1.2 billion red envelopes, worth over half a billion RMB (US$83 million), were sent out during the promotion. The number of shakes during the gala promotion achieved a total frequency of 11 billion and a peak of 810 million per minute.

=== Red Envelope War ===
The Red Envelope War is a financial battle between the two Internet companies competing for the mobile payment market in China. The competition attracted widespread attention from the public. On February 10, 2015, Alibaba announced it would give away RMB600 million (around US$97m) of "lucky money" to users, with RMB156 million in cash and RMB430 million of e-coupons from merchants on its marketplaces. Half a day after Alibaba's announcement, WeChat announced it would give away RMB500 million (around US$81m) cash and RMB3 billion (around US$484m) of e-coupons the next night.

Through Alipay Wallet, users were able to share Alibaba's digital red envelopes with their WeChat friends and send them onto WeChat's sharing platform Moments. Shortly afterwards, WeChat disabled the capability. Alibaba then changed their application to require more direct interaction with Alipay Wallet if a user wanted to give the "lucky money" to their WeChat friends. Specifically, they changed the application to generate an image with a number which could be shared on WeChat, prompting one's WeChat friends to download and open Alipay Wallet and type in the number to redeem the money.

== Market impact ==
=== User adoption ===
To send or receive money in the app, users need to link their bank accounts to WeChat. It is estimated that 100 to 200 million clients with their bank details have begun using WeChat.

=== Impact on Business ===
The growth of WeChat led some companies to use the WeChat's red envelope platform to market their brands, giving away cash or coupons to the public. This in turn drew more people to WeChat accounts and use the red envelope function, increasing the user base.

== Criticism ==
=== Phubbing Problem ===
Traditionally, Lunar New Year carries themes of reunification and strengthening relationships. However, the emphasis placed on cash-based incentives has changed the focus of the tradition into a monetary venture.

=== Fraud ===
In 2015, people were deceived by fake users and imposters on the WeChat red envelope platform. One large instance of fraud occurred when a user claimed to be Chen Guangbiao, a billionaire. This user promised to give out as much as RMB 20 million (US$3,157,000) in virtual red envelope via WeChat. Many WeChat users added the user, hoping to receive a red envelope from the billionaire. Instead, the user never gave out any money himself but ended up receiving a significant gain from users who added him. Later, Chen claimed that he was not in any way involved in the scam and urged those who were misled to contact the authorities. To avoid the similar events, Chinese police have sent out the warning messages to the public.

=== Corruption ===
Under China's corruption campaign, red envelope has been positioned as gears of bribery because it is hardly noticed by the public. Cases related have already reached 51,600 as of July 2014, recorded by Chinese government. Currently, WeChat has set a RMB200 (US$33) ceiling for red envelope-gifting. Yet precisely since the amounts involved are small and because many people might be involved in the gift-giving through the virtual red envelopes, it has proven to be challenging for the government to monitor corrupt practices carried out in this manner.
