= Toner refill =

Refilling of laser printer toner cartridges

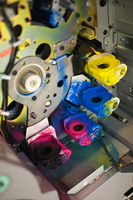
Color Toner refill

Toner refilling is the practice of refilling empty laser printer toner cartridges with new toner powder. This enables the cartridge to be reused, saving the cost of a complete new cartridge and the impact of the waste and disposal of the old one.

While toner cartridges are commonly refilled with results reported to be good, in at least some cases refilling without full remanufacturing may leave waste toner from each print and paper debris in the cartridge, potentially causing backgrounding problems and producing contamination in the refilled cartridge.

The U.S. patent for the "Refillable toner cartridge" was issued to Fred Keen on March 28, 1989.

== Refilling methods ==
There are several different methods for refilling cartridges:

Type	Description
Refilling and reuse by the end user	This is normally done by use of a DIY laser toner refill kit that includes a supply of compatible toner, reset chips where required, and instructions for the process of refilling. There are various types of toner powder, and many DIY toner refill products are available either online from ecommerce suppliers or through specialist retail stores.
Refilling and resale by the original manufacturer	It is common for toner cartridges to be sold with reply paid labels enabling them to be returned to the manufacturer for recycling and reuse.
Refilling and resale by a third party	Many independent companies that sell toner cartridges refill and reuse the original manufacturer's cartridges which they typically obtain from recycling companies. This is generally considered legitimate if the original manufacturer's branding is removed from the recycled product.
Refilling as a service	Many independent companies offer a refilling service where customers can bring empty cartridges to be refilled. Toner refill franchises have sprung up over the last few years. Such refill chains offer services for customers to bring their empty toner cartridge and have it refilled on site or exchanges with a ready filled toner cartridge.
Toner Remanufacturing	Similar to refilling, with the exception that not only is new toner added to a cartridge, but parts that ordinarily wear out are also reviewed and replaced as required.

Toner cartridges cannot be refilled indefinitely, because mechanical parts such as rollers wear out. Some cartridges include the electro-optical drum, which becomes depleted and can be scratched. Organizations refilling cartridges for resale usually clean and test each cartridge to ensure that it is fit for reuse and resale. While several sources offer empty inkjet cartridges to be refilled, brand new empty OEM laser cartridges are not easily found. Also, some models of laser print engines, like most inkjet printers, communicate with "chips" or fuses inside the toner cartridge which indicate that the cartridge is exhausted, whether or not it actually is. Some research is usually required to determine the feasibility of refilling a particular cartridge.

In general, DIY refilling requires opening a cartridge designed not to be opened, refilling it with toner, and capping the opening that was made to gain access. Some cartridges can be disassembled; others require a hole to be drilled or melted.

Toners vary in composition; manufacturers make toner designed for their own printers, and a generic toner may not work as well. In some cases there may be separate additions of toner and "developer". Refilling kits include printer-specific instructions.

The following basic types of refill toner (differing mainly in particle size and fusing temperature) have been identified by one vendor while other refill vendors insist that each printer or copier model requires a unique type.

1. HP, Canon printers
2. Canon PC copiers
3. IBM/Lexmark Optra and similar
4. Epson EPL, NEC Silentwriter
5. Xerox and Sharp
6. Samsung and Lexmark Optra E
7. Brother

Kits are available to refill the 4 toner cartridges used by colour printers (cyan, magenta, yellow and black), or to fill a single cartridge. Kits include a reset chip where necessary. In all cases a toner that is at least compatible must be used.

While there are environmental benefits to refilling the toner cartridges of laser printers, a refilled cartridge may produce inferior print quality and reliability.

1. Refilling cartridges either by the end user, or as a service, is claimed by most printer manufacturers and toner remanufacturers to be harmful to both the quality and reliability of the prints, the cartridge as well as the life of the printers.
2. Life cycle assessments may indicate that recycling is a preferable option.
3. The quality of third party toners can vary immensely, and it is also important that the toner is appropriate for the particular printer.

Common problems can include:

1. Insufficient lubricant in the toner, leading to drum, developer unit or cleaning blade damage.
2. Wrong melting point, leading to fouling in the fusing unit, print rubbing off, etc.
3. Wrong electrostatic properties or particle size, leading to a dirty machine and poor quality print.
4. Large amounts of loose toner in the machine can also cause fouling and damage to the mechanisms, and air filters can become clogged, causing overheating.

Companies and individuals that refill toner, however, indicate that in most cases the cost benefits of refilling outweigh the possible disadvantages.

== Safety considerations ==
As a fine powder, toner can remain suspended in the air for some period, and is considered to have health effects comparable to inert dust. It can be an irritant to people with respiratory conditions such as asthma or bronchitis.

Toner powder is not toxic but does need to be handled with care, as carbon black (one of its components) has been classified as a nuisance dust, designated by the International Agency for Research on Cancer as a possible carcinogen. Carbon black may contain impurities known to be carcinogens which may lead to small growths, irritated eyes, headache, itching skin and direct contact with toner can lead to skin and eye sensitisation. Health and safety regulations must be considered when handling, transporting and storing toner powders.

Safety precautions include the use of gloves, and a protective dust mask to prevent inhalation. If spilled toner is cleaned with a standard vacuum cleaner the toner may become electrically charged and catch fire, and is so fine that it passes through filters and can escape into the room or the vacuum cleaner motor.

== See also ==
- Ink cartridge#Refills and third party replacements - similar concept for inkjet printing
