= Toner (printing) =

Powder mixture in laser printers

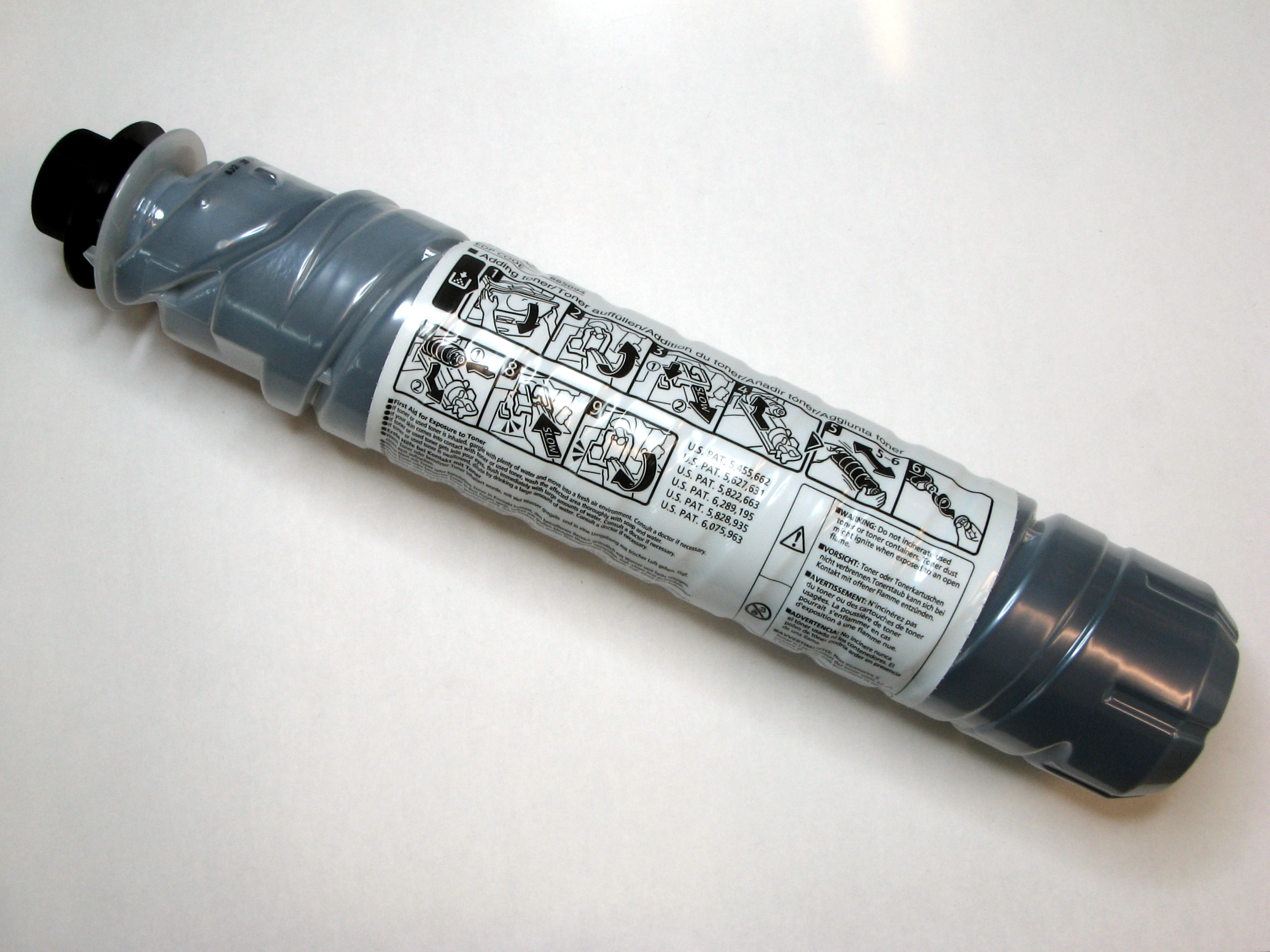
Black toner container

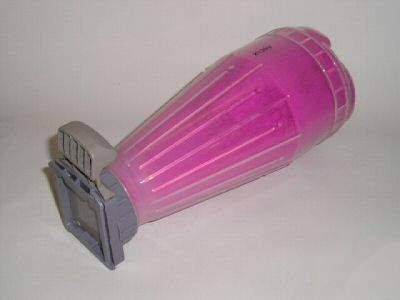
Colored toner container

Toner is a powder mixture used in laser printers and photocopiers to form the text and images on paper, in general through a toner cartridge. Mostly granulated plastic, early mixtures added only carbon powder and iron oxide; now there are mixtures that contain polypropylene, fumed silica, and various minerals for triboelectrification. Toner using plant-derived plastic also exists as an alternative to petroleum plastic. Toner particles are melted by the heat of the fuser, and are thus bonded to the paper.

In earlier photocopiers, this low-cost carbon toner was poured by the user from a bottle into a reservoir in the machine. Later copiers, and laser printers from the first 1984 Hewlett-Packard LaserJet, feed directly from a sealed toner cartridge.

Laser toner cartridges for use in color copiers and printers come in sets of cyan, magenta, yellow and black (CMYK), allowing a very large color gamut to be generated by mixing.

== Composition, size and manufacture ==
The specific polymer used varies by manufacturer but can be a styrene acrylate copolymer, a polyester resin, a styrene butadiene copolymer, or a few other special polymers. Toner formulations vary from manufacturer to manufacturer and even from machine to machine. Typically formulation, granule size and melting point vary the most.

Originally, the particle size of toner averaged 14–16 micrometres (μm) or greater. Theoretically, for the perfect reproduction of dots and print features at 600 dpi, a particle size of about 5 μm is required and, at 1200 dpi, about 3 μm is required. Further reductions in particle size producing further improvements in resolution are being developed through the application of new technologies such as Emulsion-Aggregation. Toner manufacturers maintain a quality control standard for particle size distribution in order to produce a powder suitable for use in their printers.

Toner has traditionally been made by compounding the ingredients and creating a slab which was broken or pelletized, then turned into a fine powder with a controlled particle size range by air jet milling. This process results in toner granules with varying sizes and aspherical shapes. To get a finer print, some companies are using a chemical process to grow toner particles from molecular reagents. This results in more uniform size and shapes of toner particles. The smaller, uniform shapes permit more accurate colour reproduction and more efficient toner use.

== Clean-up ==
Toner can be washed off skin and garments with cold water. Hot or warm water softens the toner, causing it to bond in place. Toner fused to skin eventually wears off, or can be partially removed using an abrasive hand cleaner. Toner fused to clothing usually cannot be removed. Unfused toner is easily cleaned from most water-washable clothing. Because toner is a wax or plastic powder with a low melting temperature it must be kept cold while cleaning.

Toner particles have electrostatic properties by design and can develop static-electric charges when they rub against other particles, objects, or the interiors of transport systems and vacuum cleaner hoses. Because of this and the small particle size, toner should not be vacuumed with a conventional home vacuum cleaner. Static discharge from charged toner particles theoretically may ignite dust in the vacuum cleaner bag or create a small explosion if sufficient toner is airborne. Toner particles are so fine that they are poorly filtered by household vacuum cleaner filter bags and can blow through the vacuum motor into the room. They can also cause overheating by clogging the motor filter and short circuit by their electric conductivity (carbon, iron) when they melt inside the motor.

If toner spills into the laser printer or photocopier, a special type of vacuum cleaner with an electrically conductive hose and a high efficiency (HEPA) filter may be needed for effective cleaning. These are called electrostatic discharge-safe (ESD-safe) or toner vacuums. Similar HEPA-filter equipped vacuums should be used for clean-up of larger toner spills.

== Health risks ==
Muhle et al. (1991) reported that the responses to chronically inhaled copying toner, a plastic dust pigmented with carbon black, titanium dioxide and silica, were also similar qualitatively to titanium dioxide and diesel exhaust.

Carbon black, one of the components of toner, is classified as "possibly carcinogenic" (Group 2B) by the IARC.

As a fine powder, toner can remain suspended in the air for some period, and is considered to have health effects comparable to inert dust. It can be an irritant to people with respiratory conditions such as asthma or bronchitis. Following studies on bacteria in the 1970s that raised concerns about health effects resulting from pyrrole, a contaminant created during manufacture of the carbon black used in black toner, manufacturing processes were changed to eliminate pyrrole from the finished product.

Research by the Queensland University of Technology has indicated that some laser printers emit submicrometer particles which have been associated in other environmental studies with respiratory diseases.

A study at the University of Rostock has found that the microscopic particles in toner are carcinogenic, similar to asbestos. Several technicians who had been working with printers and copiers on a daily basis were observed for several years. They showed increased lung problems. This confirms previous research published in 2006.

Research at Harvard University has shown that, during printing, metal-oxide nanoparticles (defined as 0.1 μm and smaller) are released into the air from toner-based laser printers and multifunction devices. These machines use toner particles that are on average 20 μm in overall diameter, but the surfaces of the toner particles themselves carry innumerable tiny metal-oxide nanoparticles. These ultra-small metal-oxide nanoparticles are highly bioactive and could cause harm to the lungs and also elsewhere in the body, given that particles 0.1 μm and smaller can cross biological membranes (including lung alveoli), thereby gaining access to all organs via blood circulation. This remains an area of active research, with many knowledge gaps.

== Packaging ==
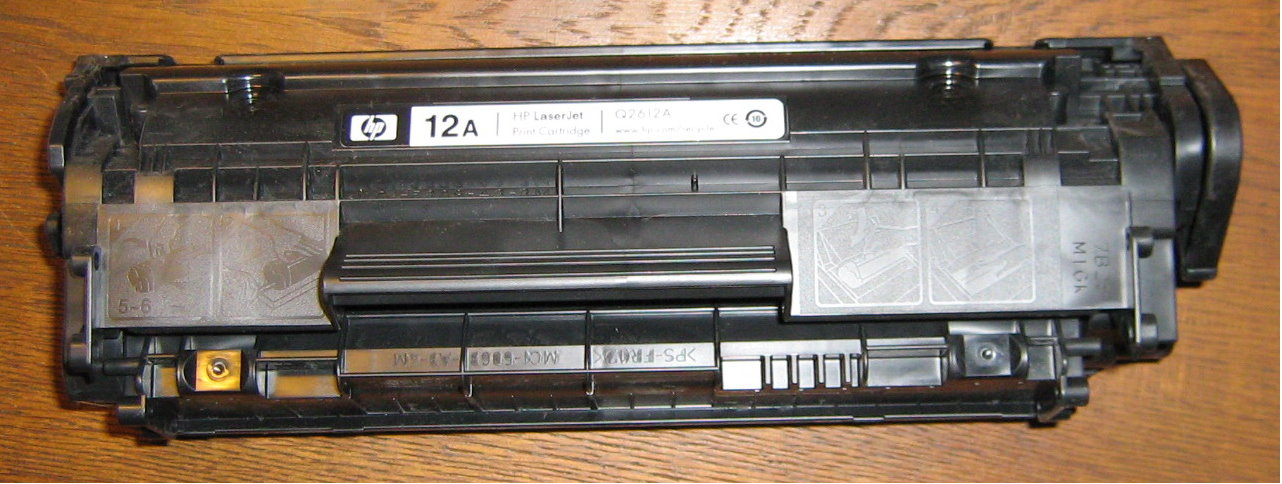
The toner cartridge is a kind of toner container, that is also a consumable component of the printer.

The toner container can be a simple pack, for toner storage and transportation, or further, a consumable component of the printer. The most common way to consume toner is with a toner cartridge (or laser toner), as an office supply of a laser printer or photocopier.

=== Repackaging ===
Several toner manufacturers offer toner in wholesale quantities. Typically, bulk loose toner is sold in barrels or 10 kg bags.

Toner is then used by a variety of industries in order to provide consumers with a finished laser toner cartridge.

Original Equipment manufacturers such as HP and Canon as well as manufacturers of compatible toner cartridges use the toner in the process of manufacturing a brand new OEM cartridge. Remanufacturers of toner cartridges use the bulk toner in the process of creating remanufactured toner cartridges. Other companies use the toner to provide a toner refill service.

Most toner cartridges are available to the average consumer through retail outlets or local remanufacturing operations. Remanufactured and refilled toner cartridges are generally offered at a lower cost than original toner cartridges, having been either wholly remanufactured and then refilled with toner (the more-optimal method) or just refilled with toner (the less-optimal method).

== Environmental considerations ==
Recycling of pre-consumer waste toner is practiced by most manufacturers. Classifying toner to the desired size distribution produces off-size rejects, but these become valuable feedstocks for the compounding operation, and are recycled this way. Post-consumer waste toner appears primarily in the cleaning operation of the photo-printing machine. In early printers, as much as 20–25% of feed toner would wind up in the cleaner sump and be discarded as waste. Improved printer efficiencies have reduced this waste stream to lower levels, although on average 13% of the toner in each cartridge is still wasted. Some printer designs have attempted to divert this waste toner back into the virgin toner reservoir for direct reuse in the printer; these attempts have met with mixed success as the composition of the toner will change by expending fusibles while retaining developer particles. Some consideration and fewer industry attempts have been made to reclaim waste toner by cleaning it and "remanufacturing" it.

Most toner goes to printed pages, a large fraction of which are ultimately recycled in paper recovery and recycling operations. Removal of toner from the pulp is not easy, and toner formulations to ease this step have been reported. Hydrolyzable, water-soluble, and caustic-soluble toner resins have been reported, but do not appear to enjoy widespread application. Most paper recycling facilities mix toner with other waste material, such as inks and resins, into a sludge with no commercial use.

== Toner-modified asphalt binder ==
Since toner consists of several copolymers and it is a carbon-based material, it can be used as a useful modifier for the asphalt industry. It has been shown that inclusion of left-over burnt toner enhances the rheological and mechanical properties of asphalt binder, significantly. Such an application can be placed as an environmentally friendly alternative to prevent soil contamination due to the landfilling of waste toner. Adding waste toner into asphalt binder and mixture decreases the binder's glass transition temperature and also, in the meantime increase the crystallization temperature as well.
