= Digital coupon =

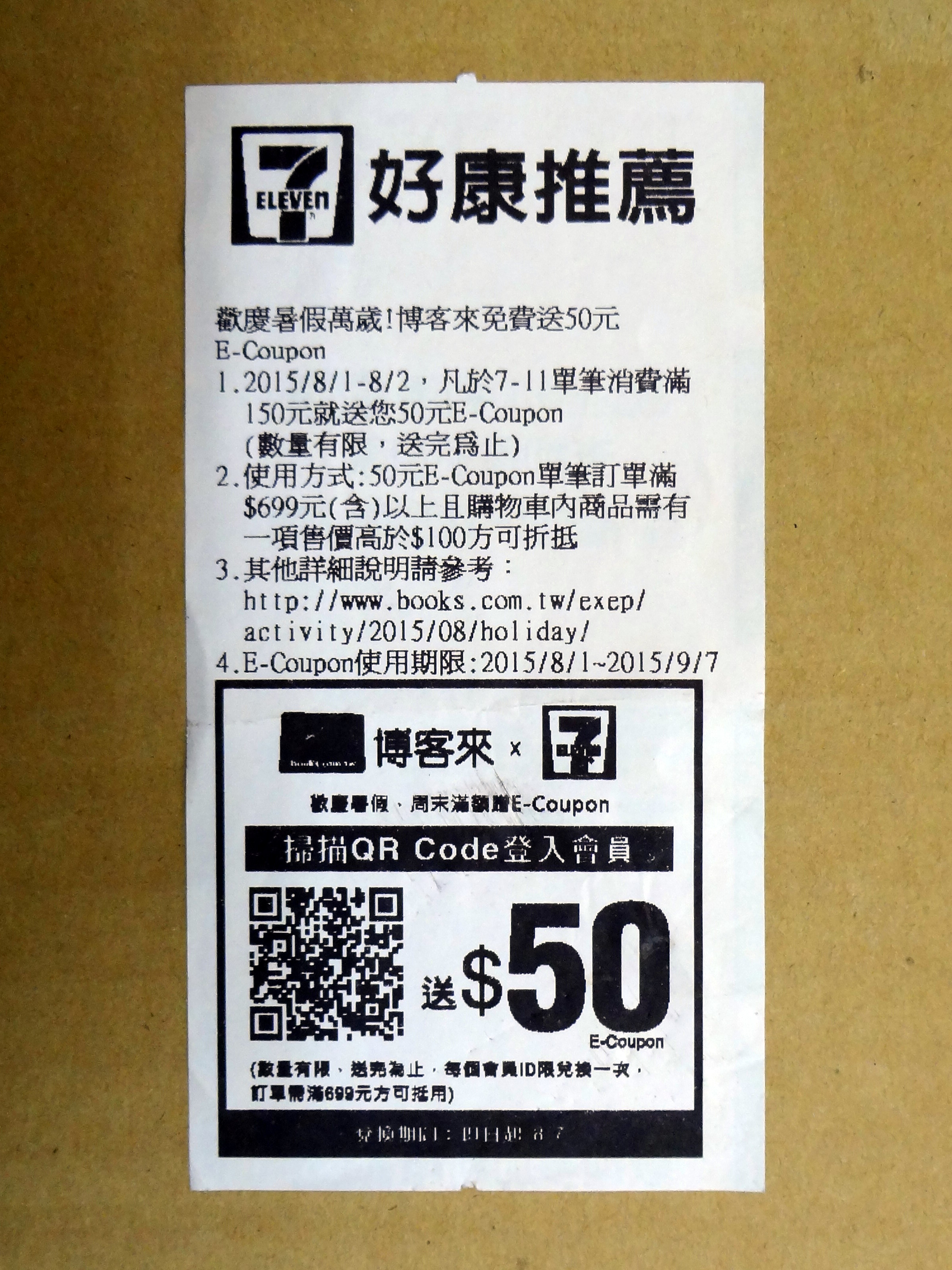
7-Eleven e-coupon from Taiwan

Digital coupons (also known as e-coupons, e-clips or clipped deals) are the digital analogue of paper coupons which are used to provide customers with discounts or gifts in order to attract the purchase of some products. Mostly, grocery and drug stores offer e-coupon services in loyalty program events. Even though there are still traditional coupons for daily must-have items such as diapers, detergents and toothpaste, e-coupons are actively issued in services like amusement parks, performances, restaurants and travel agencies.

== E-coupons classification ==
Static E-coupons

Static e-coupons are quite similar with traditional coupons and their value does not change over time. Once the user has downloaded e-coupons, the offering value does not depend on the period of time. It is assumable to indicate the validity period with the case of possible changes of the value but there is no determination of exact period of time after the users have obtained them.

Dynamic E-coupons

Dynamic e-coupons, unlike static e-coupons, tend to contain information of the downloaded time. They make the users to purchase the product as soon as possible with an offered discount whose value is about to decrease from the date of the download. In this way of offering e-coupons, manufacturers take an advantage of immediate selling goods and promotion of product circulation while it is more pressure for customers that they have to find a better priced products on time. Hence, dynamic e-coupons are preferable for the companies to advertise their products and services on the web.

== E-coupon security and manageability ==
E-coupons have not been fully exploited today because of lack of techniques to tackle the distribution. It is essential to meet the requirements of the e-coupon system so as to achieve security and efficiency in management. The system must satisfy the following requirements:

- Identification - each e-coupon must belong to its eligible owner
- Transferability - every e-coupon must be transferred among customers and be authorized by the user
- Unforgeability - valid e-coupons must be offered by only issuers
- Non-repudiation - each entity must accept the e-coupon owner's participation in transactions
- Expired - each e-coupon must be set with expiration date
- States manageability - all e-coupons whether they are being used or not must be in the system
- Independence - e-coupon system must be utilized in diverse platforms
- Machine-understandability - e-coupons must be run with XML language that can make machine-readability more efficient

== See also ==
- Coupon (bond)
- Drug coupon
- Extreme Couponing
- Coupon-eligible converter box
