= IBM 3800 =

Continuous form laser printer designed and manufactured by IBM

IBM 3800 printer
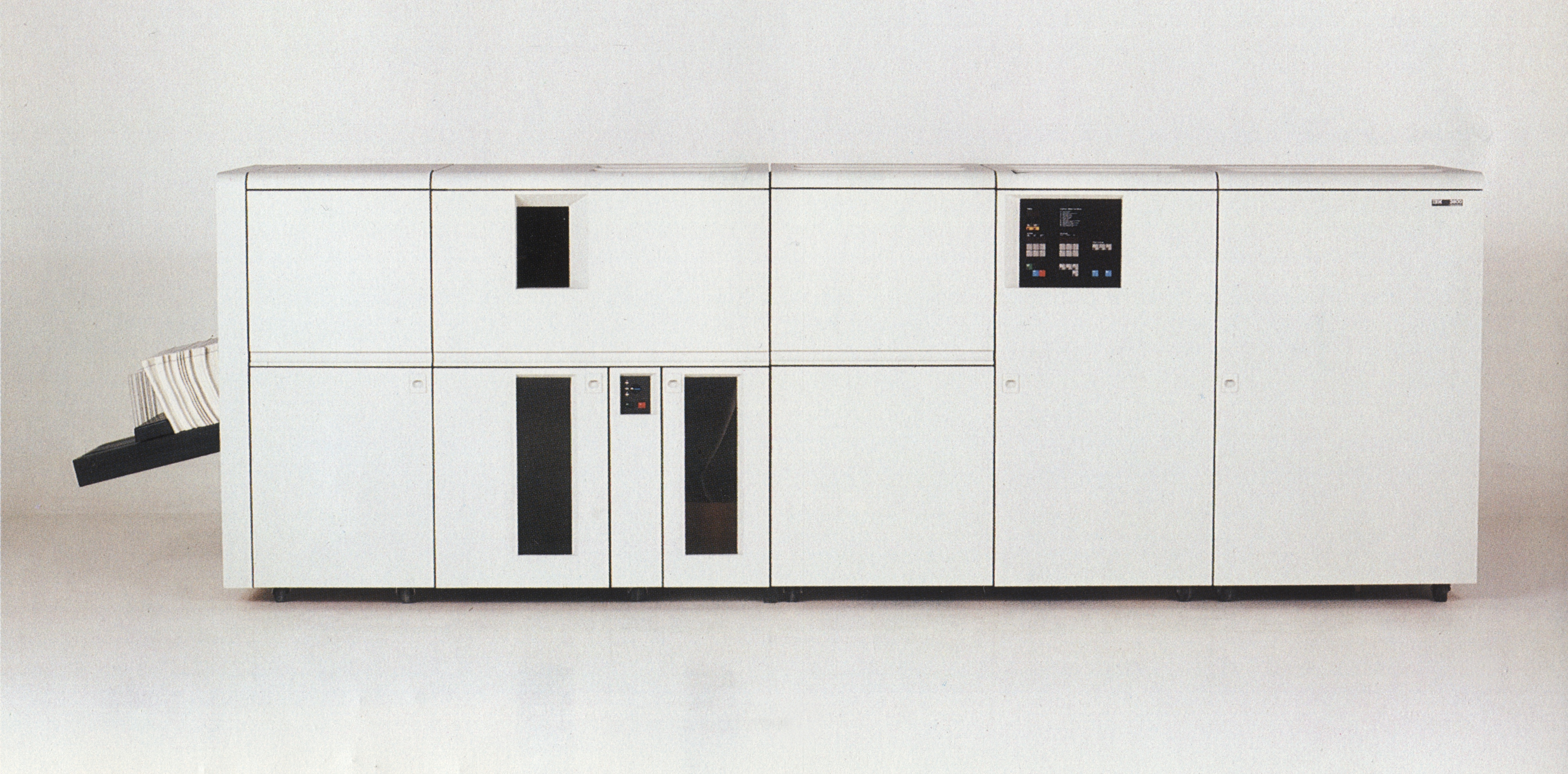
- Date invented: 1975; 51 years ago
- Invented by: IBM
- Manufacturer: IBM
- Introduced: 1976; 50 years ago
- Discontinued: 1999; 27 years ago
- Type: Printer
- Dots per inch: 240x240 (model 3)
- Speed: 215 ppm (model 3)

The IBM 3800 is a discontinued laser printer designed and manufactured by IBM. It was the first commercially available laser printer (see below for detail). It was a continuous-form printer, meaning that it printed onto a continuous sheet of either fan-fold or roll sheet paper.

The 3800 was initially positioned as a line printer replacement with additional features. Besides the much greater speed, enhancements over the line printer included:

- Forms overlay – the ability to print a predefined form along with the data, eliminating the need for preprinted forms.
- Thirteen different character sets. The standard 3800 could use only one per print data set; a special feature allowed four to be used at a time.
- Multiple copies printed on single-ply paper, rather than using multiple-ply paper, data could be changed or suppressed between copies.
- User-defined graphic characters could be used along with standard character sets.

Later the 3800 family supported Advanced Function Presentation (AFP), a page description language with features similar to Xerox Corporation's Interpress or Adobe Systems' PostScript.

The 3800 attached to a mainframe system via a parallel (Bus and Tag) channel. Support for two channels was available as an option.

The IBM 3900 was announced in 1990 as a replacement for the 3800. The 3800 was discontinued in 1999.

== Development and manufacturing ==
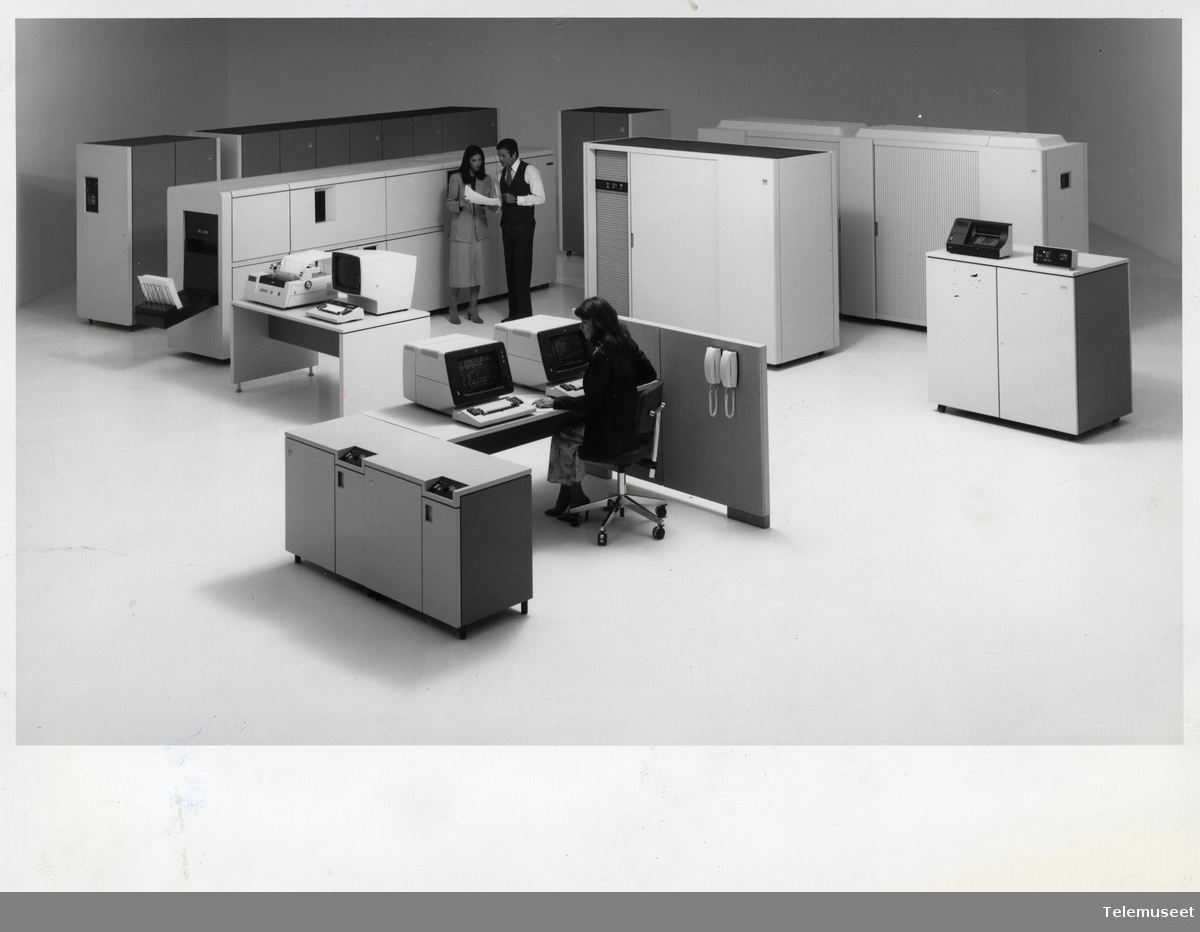
IBM 3800 model 1 with BTS in computer room (directly behind the lady in the image)

Development began in 1969 using a project code name of Jubilee. Later, the code name was changed to Argonaut. IBM did not however have a xerographic printer to base the Jubilee on (all IBM printers up to this point were mechanical printers, e.g., chain, print bar, train). This meant prototyping used an IBM Copier I, which was not capable of anywhere near the product goal of 1 million pages per month. Therefore, dramatic developments were required in areas such as paper path handling, lasers and optics, toner fusion, and control electronics.

The IBM 3800 was developed and initially manufactured in San Jose, California.

Manufacturing in the US was transferred from San Jose to Tucson, Arizona, with the opening of the Tucson plant in 1980. This was a major effort considering the 3800 consisted of more than 9000 part numbers. This continued till IBM shut down manufacturing in Tucson in 1989, with printer manufacturing moving to Charlotte, North Carolina.

For world trade export, the IBM 3800 was also manufactured at the IBM plant at Järfälla, Sweden, with the first 3800 shipping from there in November 1976. Manufacturing continued there for more than eight years.

== First plain-paper laser printer ==
There are competing claims about which device was the first commercially available plain-paper laser printer.

- The Xerox 1200 (which could run at 4000 lines per minute) was announced in 1973 and first shipped it in late 1974. It used an optical character generator designed by optical engineer Phil Chen. This consisted of a rotating drum that had 132 columns, each with a full character set. A set of 22 flash lamps inside the drum would flash, exposing the characters onto the selenium drum as the character generator drum rotated, one line being printed for each rotation of the character generator drum. This limited the printer to a single 95-character font but made it an ideal line printer replacement with both upper- and lowercase output. In a Xerox marketing blog, they describe the Xerox 1200 as the: first commercial non-impact Xerographic printer for computer output.
- The Honeywell Page Printing System (PPS) was an electro-static printer that could run at up to 18,000 lines per minute and was announced in 1974. The PPS used special dielectric paper, rather than plain paper. The PPS used a matrix printhead that consisted of two rows of electrodes known as sytli, which placed a charge directly onto the dielectric paper, after which the paper moved to the toner station. It supported only one font (known as the Honeywell optimized font), that could be printed in two sizes (small and large). There was no laser or photoconductor involved.
- The IBM 3800 was announced in 1975 and first shipped in 1976 The IBM 3800 used pin-fed plain paper perforated continuous forms. It exposed the image with a laser and could use multiple fonts.
- The Xerox 9700 was released in 1977. Development began in 1971, although its project leader Gary Starkweather, had demonstrated a laser printing process in 1969. It could print 120 pages per minute at 300 dpi.
- The IBM 6670 was announced February 1979 and was IBM's first cut-sheet laser printer.

== Models ==
There were several models of the IBM 3800 laser printer.

=== 3800 model 001 ===
The model 001 was announced on April 15, 1975, and first shipped July 1976. It had a print resolution of 144 pels per inch (or dots per inch, pels are print elements) vertically and 180 pels per inch horizontally. It could print at up to 13,360 lines per minute or 45,000 characters per second (which IBM claimed was 6 times faster than their fastest printer at that time) depending on line density (which could range from 6 to 12 lines per inch). It could print at 10, 12 or 15 characters per inch, printing at 6 or 8 or 12 lines per inch.

The model 001 was the only model that supported the tape-to-print feature (feature code 7810), where an IBM 3411/3410 or IBM 3803/3420 reel-to-reel tape drive could be attached to the 3800, allowing the printer to operate in an offline mode.

In 1980, IDC predicted that the IBM 3800 would by 1983 control 48% of the non-impact printer market with the Xerox 9700 controlling 31%.

=== 3800 model 002 ===
The model 002 was announced in 1979. It was a model 001 printer that had been modified to allow it to print kanji characters.

=== 3800 model 003 ===
The model 003 was a much faster version of the 3800. It was announced November 1, 1982, At a speed of 215 page impressions per minute (or 20,400 lines per minute), it was the fastest printer of its time. IBM claimed it was twice as fast as the Model 001. It was the first AFP printer in the 3800 line. The three main goals of the model 003 were:

- Improved print resolution. The model 3 had a print resolution of 240 × 240 pels versus the Model 001 and 002, which had a resolution of 180 × 144 pels.
- Improved graphics printing capability. It could also print 4 type styles per document (where the Model 001 could only print one).
- Reduced service costs over the model 001.

To improve the resolution, a new photoconductor material had to be used in combination with a specially designed digital voltmeter and a significant redesign of the laser print head. The helium-neon laser developed for the model 001 was retained, but lenses were used to generate two printing beams that reflected off a slightly more slowly rotating mirror (the mirror in model 001 rotated at 15,300 RPM versus the model 003, which rotated at 12,700 RPM).

Paper moved through the printer at a constant velocity of 31 inches per second. The 3800 could print out 1.7 miles of paper per hour.

=== 3800 model 006 ===
The model 006 was announced on January 26, 1987, and shipped later that year. It was functionally identical to the model 003 but only ran at 134 pages per minute. It could be upgraded to a model 003.

=== 3800 model 008 ===
The model 008 was physically similar to a model 003 but supported double-byte character sets, which allowed kanji characters to be printed (effectively making it a replacement for the model 002). In comparison to the model 002, it could print three times more kanji characters (22,500) with significantly better print resolution.

== Example customers ==
A Computerworld article published in 1990 reported there were an estimated 10,000 IBM 3800s deployed worldwide. Some example customers included:

- F.W. Woolworth Corporation reported in a Computerworld article in 1976 that they were using a 3800 to print reports that if laid end-to end, would stretch for nearly 200 miles. They commented that the speed of the printer allowed them to print the same report multiple times in high quality, avoiding the need to use carbon paper to produce low quality copies.
- In 1980 Fidelity Bank reported that they were using two 3800s to replace impact printers.
- Also in 1980 Trustco reported that they replaced two IBM 3211 printers with a 3800, which they claimed saved them $7200 per month
- In 1985 Southern California Edison reported they used four IBM 3800s to print 185,000 power bills on average every working day.

== Technological innovations in the IBM 3800 ==
Being the first Laser Printer produced by IBM and with no similar existing products to use as models, the IBM 3800 contained many new technological features. This is a short list of some of them:

=== Long-life cleaning brush ===
The cleaning brush used to clean toner from the photoconductor would wear out after one month of operation. Through a variety of improvements this was extended to four months.

=== Long-life helium-neon laser ===
By using low-helium-diffusion glass, IBM increased the life of the laser to 20,000 operation hours, an improvement of 10× over off-the-shelf products available at that time. The HeNe laser used in the IBM 3800 used more than 25 milliwatts (compared to 5 milliwatts in the later IBM 6670 or 1 milliwatt in the IBM 3666 barcode scanner).

=== Long-life hot roll ===
The hot roll that fuses the toner to the page needed to operate without silicone oil (to avoid contamination) and to have an extended life, so a new elastomer material was developed as well as a multi-zone preheat platen to warm the paper to 104 °C (219 °F) prior to fusion.

=== Long-life xenon flash lamp ===
A flash lamp was used as part of the form overlay system that optionally was used to print a fixed form onto each page. This system used a lamp that had to pulse for only 125 μs. Initial life span of the lamp was only one month, but through a variety of design changes this was extended to 60 months.

=== Print-contrast mark ===
To ensure print contrast remained consistent over time, a special control mark was printed on every page. An LED sensor would monitor this mark and this was used to control how much toner was routinely fed into the developer mix. It could also detect if the printer was producing blank pages unexpectedly.

=== Discharged area development ===
Although not an innovation it is worth noting that IBM chose to use discharged area development on the 3800. After placing a static charge on the photoconductor the laser was then used to discharge the parts of the surface where characters needed to be developed. Toner was then attracted only to those discharged areas. Because a typical page at that time had far more white space than printed space, this allowed for faster print speeds. However later printers like the IBM 6670 used charged area development where the laser discharged those areas where toner was not needed, as this yielded better print quality, closer to that seen with the Selectric typewriter.

== TNF-based photoconductor ==
The original photoconductor used by the IBM 3800 (and also by the IBM Copier, IBM Copier II and IBM 3896) was a high-sensitivity organic photoconductor for electrophotography developed by IBM. IBM developed this to avoid patent infringement with Xerox (who used a photoconductor based on selenium). The IBM developed organic photoreceptor (OPC) used a chemical known as 2, 4, 7-trinitro-9-fluorenone, commonly referred to as TNF. The photoconductor was mainly composed of a TNF and polyvinyl carbazole resin coating on an aluminized mylar sheet and was manufactured by IBM in Lexington Kentucky.

Over the course of the 1970s, health and safety concerns were raised about TNF being carcinogenic. The US Federal Department of Health and Human Services contracted the National Institute for Occupational Safety and Health to investigate these concerns but their report did not identify any issues. Despite this, in 1980 IBM changed its advice and required its employees to always handle it with gloves. Staff at the New York State Department of Social Services refused to operate their 3800 on a number of occasions during 1980 and 25 workers were issued smocks, gloves and masks as part of a union grievance settlement in an effort to make them continue to operate the machine.

IBM then withdrew TNF based photoconductors in late 1981 for the IBM 3800 and IBM Copier II, replacing them with a photoconductor based on chlorotiane blue and diethylaminobenzal- denyde-dithenylhydrazone (sometimes called blue coral). This material was already being used in the IBM Series III Copier and the IBM 6670 and was manufactured by IBM in Boulder Colorado.

== Replacement product ==
IBM partnered with Hitachi Koki Co Ltd (HKK) to OEM a Hitachi-developed printer, released as the IBM 3900. The print engine was developed by HKK while the control unit was IBM's Advanced Function Common Control Unit (AFCCU) based on the IBM RS/6000. It was announced October 1990 and shipped in late 1991. IBM formally announced their development relationship with HKK in 1992.

== Other 38xx/39xx non-impact page printers ==
There were other non-impact page printers in the 38xx and 39xx series from IBM.

=== IBM 3812 ===
The IBM 3812 was one of the first office laser printers produced by IBM.

The 3812 (of which there were two models, 3812–001 and 3812–002) was described as a tabletop pageprinter.

The 3812-001 was announced on Oct 15, 1985 and operated at 12 pages per minute maximum. It was not technically a laser printer as it used a LED printhead. The 3812-002 was announced on June 16, 1987.

The 3812-001 was withdrawn from marketing on April 4, 1987 (effective November 4, 1987). The 3812-002 was withdrawn from marketing October 1991.

=== IBM 3816 ===
The IBM 3816 was described as an "electrostatic page printer".

It was announced in March 1989 and operated at 24 impressions per minute maximum. The 3816-01S was simplex while the 3816-01D was duplex.

=== IBM 3820 ===
The IBM 3820, announced on February 12, 1985, was IBM's first AFP cut-sheet printer. The 3820 could be attached to a host mainframe system via Systems Network Architecture SNA/SDLC, or to a PC using the IBM Personal Computer Network (PCLAN) or Corvus Omninet. An entry-level 3820 sold for $29,900 (equivalent to $89,506 in 2025). It operated at 20 pages per minute.

It was withdrawn from marketing November 1993.

=== IBM 3825 ===
The IBM 3825 was announced in 1989. It was a cut-sheet, duplex, non-impact, all-points-addressable AFP page printer that operated at 58 impressions per minute It was withdrawn from marketing in 1995.

=== IBM 3827 ===
The IBM 3827 was announced in 1988. It was a cut-sheet, duplex, non-impact, all-points-addressable AFP page printer that operated at 92 impressions per minute. While the control unit was developed by IBM, the print engine was a Kodak 1392. It was withdrawn from marketing in 1995.

=== IBM 3828 ===
The IBM 3828 was a MICR version of the 3827. It was announced October 1990.

It was withdrawn from marketing in October 1999.

=== IBM 3829 ===
The IBM 3829 was announced in 1993. It was a cut-sheet, duplex, non-impact, all-points-addressable AFP page printer that operated at 92 impressions per minute. While the control unit was developed by IBM, the print engine was a Kodak 1392. It was withdrawn from marketing in 1997.

=== IBM 3835 ===
The IBM 3835 was announced in 1988 and was an intermediate speed fanfold AFP page printer that operated at 88 impressions per minute.

=== IBM 3900 ===
The 3900 was announced on Oct 2, 1990 as a replacement product for the IBM 3800. It was a high speed fanfold AFP page printer that operated at 229 pages per minute.

=== IBM 3935 ===
The IBM 3935 was announced in November 1993 and was an intermediate-speed duplex-capable cut-sheet AFP page printer that operated at 35 impressions per minute.

== End of IBM's printer business ==
In 2007 IBM formed a joint venture, InfoPrint Solutions Company, with Ricoh. The new company, headquartered in Boulder, Colorado, took over all of IBM Printing Systems Division products, including the successors to the 3800 line. In 2010 IBM divested its share and the new company became a wholly owned subsidiary of Ricoh. All of its products are currently maintained by Ricoh and no longer by IBM.

== See also ==
- List of IBM products
- Xerography
