= Page printer =

Printer which prints a whole page at a time

A page printer is a computer printer which processes and prints a whole page at a time, as opposed to printers which print one line or character at a time such as line printers and dot-matrix printers. Page printers are often all incorrectly termed “laser printers”—although virtually all laser printers are page printers, other page printing technologies also exist.

== Components ==
The components of a page printer are:

- A print engine, "the unit within a printer that does the actual printing." For example, in a laser printer this would consist of the laser and drum and the mechanical paper feeds.
- Memory to process input and build up the image of a page. The printer may have its own memory or may use the host computer's memory.
- A page description language (PDL), with commands which tell the printer how to format the page. Popular PDLs are PCL (Printer Command Language) from Hewlett-Packard, PostScript from Adobe Systems and PostScript clones, and Windows’ Graphics Device Interface (GDI).
- A raster image processor (RIP), i.e. a processor which constructs the bitmap image of the page. Sometimes, this processing is done by the host computer. In other cases printers may have imbedded processors to perform this task.
- A printer driver, a program (device driver) which converts the computer's information about the page into the actual PDL. Printer drivers may be included with the operating system, be distributed with the printer on CDs or DVDs, or be downloaded from the printer manufacturer's home page or from independent web sites.
- A connection (interface) to the host computer. Many printers communicate by Wi-Fi. Other popular interfaces are USB and Ethernet. Many older printers also have a parallel (Centronics) interface. High-end printers often have a channel interface for direct connection to a mainframe computer.

== Page printing technologies ==
There are several page printing technologies, for example:

- Laser printers, in which a laser beam draws the page image on charged drum which collects charged toner and transfers the image to paper.
- LED printers, which use light-emitting diodes instead of a laser beam, but are otherwise very similar to laser printers.
- Melted wax (“phaser”) printers, where solid ink is heated to the melting point and is applied on the print medium where it immediately solidifies.
- Dye-sublimation printers, where a solid ink (dye) is converted to a gaseous state (sublimation) and applied on the print medium, where it immediately solidifies.

== Properties ==
- Resolution, 600 or 1200 dpi (dots per inch) is common in most modern page printers, often with resolution enhancement or anti-aliasing to smooth uneven lines. Higher resolutions are common. Before about 1992, the year Hewlett-Packard made the LaserJet 4, built around a Canon engine, most page printers had only 300 dpi, which made visible jagged lines and relatively poor image quality.
- Engine speed. In 1984 Canon introduced the first “small”—32 kilograms (71 lb)— laser printers which could sit on a (sturdy) desktop with a print speed of 8 pages per minute (ppm). Today, even the smallest page printers may be able to print 15–20 ppm, and the largest may print above 1000 ppm.
- Processing power. Usually larger printers have more powerful processors than small personal ones.
- Size, from personal page printers at 8–10 kilograms (18–22 lb) to high-volume production printers which may not be installed by one person.
- Cost, both cost of the printer and the operating costs. Generally, the larger and more expensive printers have lower operating costs than the small and inexpensive ones.
- Paper-handling facilities for folding, stapling, etc., especially for the larger printers.
- Colour printing capability. Many printers print in black only. Colour printers usually have multiple toner cartridges, wax patrons etc. Printers using CMYK colour have four, one each for the colours cyan, magenta, yellow, and black. RGB printers have three, red, green, and blue, but may also have a "true black". Some ink jet printers may have additional cartridges, for example light cyan and light magenta in addition to the others, but this is rarely found in page printers.
- Multi-function devices provide additional functions such as copying, scanning, or Fax.
- Media handling: Most page printers accept paper, transparencies, envelopes, labels etc. in formats up to A4 and letter. Some printers may also handle other media types such as larger formats and heavier paper.
- Energy consumption, noise, etc. Some page printers are too noisy to stay in the near vicinity of the users, even if page printers are quieter than the old line printers and other impact printers.

== See also ==
- Interpress
- IBM 3800
- Xerox 1200
