= Borelli =

Borelli is a surname of Italian origin. The name refers to:

- Alda Borelli (1879–1964), Italian stage and cinema actress
- Alfredo Borelli (1858–1943) French born Italian zoologist
- Carla Borelli (b. 1942), American television actress
- Deneen Borelli (b. 1964), American author and television personality
- Florencia Borelli (b. 1992), Argentine middle- and long-distance runner
- Giovanni Alfonso Borelli (1608–1679), Italian Renaissance physicist and mathematician
- Guido Borelli (b. 1952), Italian painter
- Jake Borelli (b. 1991), American actor
- Joseph Borelli (b. 1982), Member of the New York City Council, representing District 51.
- Juan José Borrelli (b. 1970), Argentine professional football player
- Jorge Borelli (b. 1964), Argentine professional football player
- Lyda Borelli (1884–1959), Italian theater and film actress
- Roberto Borelli (b. 1963), Brazilian water polo player
- Ronald F. Borelli (1936–2006), American Engineer, Inventor and Executive
- Sergio Borelli (1923–2021), Italian journalist

== See also ==
- Borrell
