= Trustco =

Trustco, or TrustCo, may refer to:

- Trustco Bank, a bank in the United States
- Trustco Bank Namibia, a microfinance bank in Namibia
- Trustco Group Holdings, a JSE Limited-listed Namibian company
