= Honeywell Page Printing System =

Continuous forms electrostatic printer

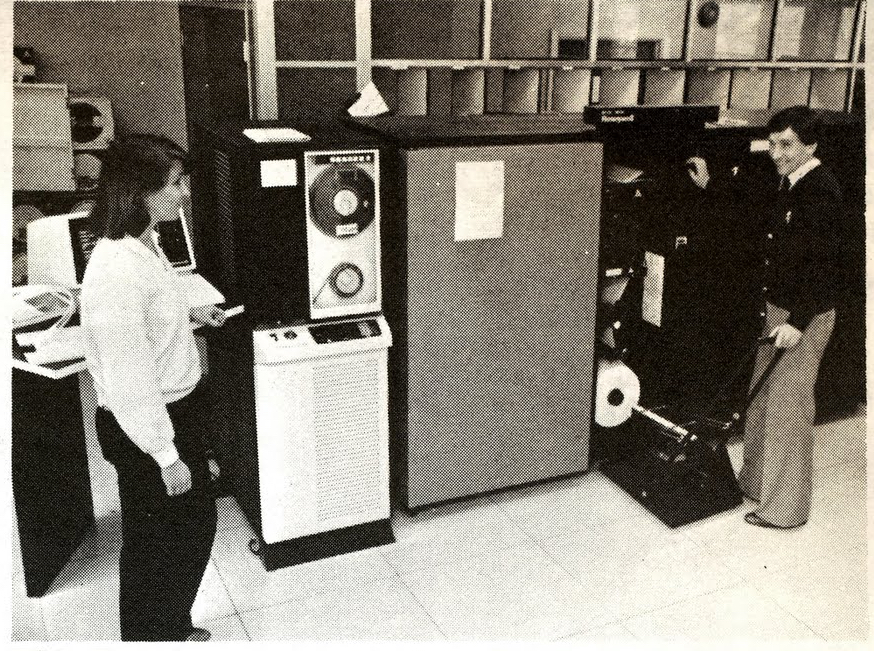
- Honeywell PPS
- Introduced: 1974

The Honeywell Page Printing System (PPS) announced in 1974, is the first commercially successful high speed non-impact printer. It could produce output at up to 18,000 lines per minute, where the earlier Xerox 1200 (the first commercially available electro-static printer) ran at 4000 lines per minute and the contemporary IBM 3211 (which was an impact printer), ran at 2000 lines per minute. Most printer history has focused on the later IBM 3800 and the Xerox 9700.

== Development ==
The PPS was designed by Honeywell Information Systems (HIS) in Oklahoma City. Development began in 1967, under a team led by Ronald F Borelli. Their initial goal was to exceed 5,000 lines per minute and after six years of development, they shipped their first pre-production unit to Lawrence Livermore Lab in 1973. It was able to run at 18,000 lines per minute.

Honeywell had three primary goals with the PPS:

- Speed: The goal was to be significantly faster than current printers. The increase in speed also meant that carbon paper would not be needed, it was fast enough to simply print several copies.
- Print Quality: The goal was to achieve a significant increase in print quality, especially in comparison to carbon-copy quality.
- System Support: To allow system users to easily generate reports and forms and run the system in an offline capacity, allowing the printer to be shared.

== Product design ==
The PPS consisted of four major subsystems:

1. Magnetic Tape Subsystem This could read industry standard 1/2 inch magnetic tape in a read only fashion. It could read 7 or 9 track tape written at up to 1600 bits per inch.
2. Processor Subsystem: It used a 16 bit processor with 775 nanosecond memory based on the Honeywell System 700 minicomputer.
3. Console Subsystem: This was a system console used to manage the entire system.
4. Page Printing Subsystem: This consisted of two cabinets. In the first cabinet, called the basic cabinet, was the printing engine. There was a format drum which could print a fixed image onto each page (which they claimed eliminated the need for pre-printed forms), a print head matrix, a toning station (with one colour), a paper transport drive and a sheet cutter. In the second cabinet there were 8 pockets to stack the cut output, holding up to 800 sheets of printed output in variable sizes. Stacker management software allowed control over how the output was stacked or collated. Later Honeywell offered 16, then 24 and then 32 stackers per PPS.

Honeywell claimed that the PPS had two unique systems:

1. The electrode printhead. The printhead used a printed circuit design with 38 micron thick electrodes that created a latent image using electrostatic charge on the dielectric paper. There were 2112 styli in two rows of 1056 each. The print head was 268.2 mm wide allowing 132 character lines. It offered only one 96 character font known as the Honeywell Optimized Font that could be printed in two sizes. Smaller characters were 16 X 18 dots and larger characters that were 20 X 22 dots. It was effectively capable of printing 200 dots per inch.
2. The liquid toning system. After creating the latent image, liquid toner using positively charged pigment particles suspended in an insulated hydrocarbon liquid that was transferred to the paper surface using a transfer roll. The toner was fixed to the paper with a heated platen and blower system.

The PPS speed was optionally either 8,000, 12,000 or 18,000 lines per minute (which usually equated to 90, 140 or 210 pages per minute). The speed could be increased as a purchased upgrade. It used a large roll of special dielectric paper, which was 3800 feet in length. The paper roll consisted of conductive base paper coated with a thin layer of dielectric material. After printing it was cut to one of 14 desired sheet sizes and then stacked. The printer was able to pre-print the page (adding a logo or a background form) prior to printing the variable data by using a custom engraved magnesium cylinder also called a forms roll. This avoided the need to use pre-printed forms.

== Models ==
There were three Models: I, II, II/E.

The Model II was announced in June 1979. The model II is described as having the following:

- A built in Honeywell Level 6/Model 43 Processor, with 256KB of memory and an 96MB hard drive.
- It could be directly attached to an IBM Mainframe such as an IBM 4381, as well as Univac and Burroughs systems. It did this by emulating a tape drive rather than appearing as a system printer.
- A hole punch that could punch two or three holes, top or side.
- Up to four stackers, meaning 8 to 32 pockets, each holding 500 sheets of output. Each stacker added 8 extra pockets.
- Up to 4 character sets of 128 characters each
- The option to use different coloured liquid toner (not just black)
- It could print digital forms as well as use changeable metal cylinders
- A Model I could be field upgraded to a Model II.

The Model II/E was announced by Ron Borelli before or during May 1981. The major change appears to have been around options to increase the CPU, memory and hard drive space of the Level 6 Microcomputer. This offered new software options such as allowing users to queue print jobs.

There are references to a model III in at least two sources. A 1980 Computerworld Magazine suggested that Honeywell planned to add duplex printing by 1983.

== Example customers ==
While limited shipments occurred between 1973 and 1976, sales began in earnest in 1976 when a dedicated sales force was established. The PPS Operation was run as a separate company within the Honeywell Corporation with its own manufacturing, research and development and marketing teams with 75 marketing (sales) personnel. In February 1979 they reported there were 150 PPSs installed, and in June 1979 they claimed to have sold and installed 250 systems. They claimed typical users produced between 1.2 and 1.5 million pages of output per month. Honeywell advertising suggested the printer was cost effective at 400,000 pages per month and could potentially print up to four million pages per month.

An IDC report in 1980 found that while the PPS was cheaper than the IBM 3800 or Xerox 9700, the cost of the special paper needed by the PPS was significantly higher at 0.0068 cents per sheet versus 0.0043 cents per sheet for plain paper.

Sample customer included:

- Certified Grocers of California who installed one of the first commercially shipped PPSs in January 1975 and by early 1976 was using two of them to produce 1.3 million pages of output per month.
- In 1977 Howard Johnson (a restaurant and Motel chain) reported they were using a PPS for all their printing needs.
- In October 1978 Griffon Computer Systems of New York reported they were installing a PPS valued at US$178,000. Also, Michigan National Bank installed two systems: one in their Southfield data center with a Honeywell 716 processor, and in their Lansing data center with a Level 6 processor.
- In 1979 BP Oil installed two 8,000 line per minute PPSs to supplement their 2000 line per minute Univac 0770 printers (which they retained to print cheques).
- In 1981 Massey Ferguson in the United Kingdom installed a PPS valued at US$290,000.
- NASA
- Department of the Army: In a 1996 report to Congress they stated they had several Model II PPSs and that they were eight years old and needed constant repair.

== Replacement product ==
Honeywell and the Bull group began a business relationship in 1974, which resulted in Honeywell-Bull being created in 1976. By 1988 Honeywell Bull was consolidated into group Bull and in 1989, renamed to Bull, a WorldWide Information Systems company, at which time Honeywell Information Systems effectively ceased to exist. In 1988 Bull released the 4000 series, that had a similar physical layout to the PPS, using roll paper and a DPS/6 Control Unit (the renamed Level 6). However it also had three major differences:

- It used plain paper and ion deposition
- It was duplex, using two print engines to print on both sides of the paper at the same time.
- It could produce 180, 240 or 300 impressions per minute based on the model (note this is duplex speed, so pages per minute were 90, 120 or 150).

Bull Printing Systems was sold to Delphax for an undisclosed sum at the end of 1991. At that time it was earning $20million USD revenue per year.
