= Level 6 =

Level 5 may refer to:

- Level 5 in UK National Qualifications Framework
- Level 5 in International Nuclear Event Scale "Serious Accident", the penultimate level
- Level 5 in English football league system (section Promotion and relegation rules for the top eight levels)
- Honeywell Level 6 minicomputer manufactured by Honeywell, Inc. from the mid 1970s
- STANAG 4569 protection level
