= LED printer =

Type of computer printer

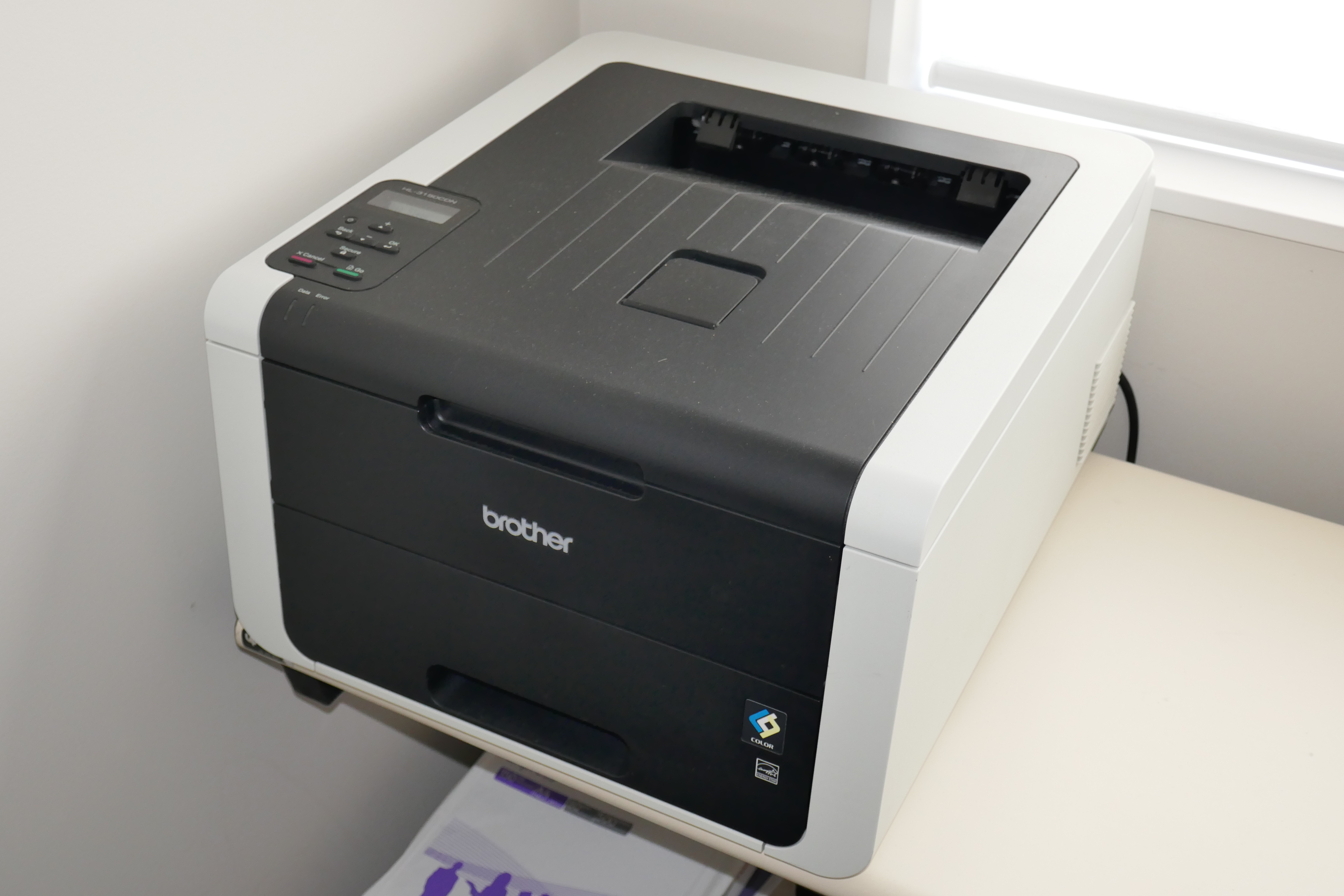
Brother desktop color LED printer

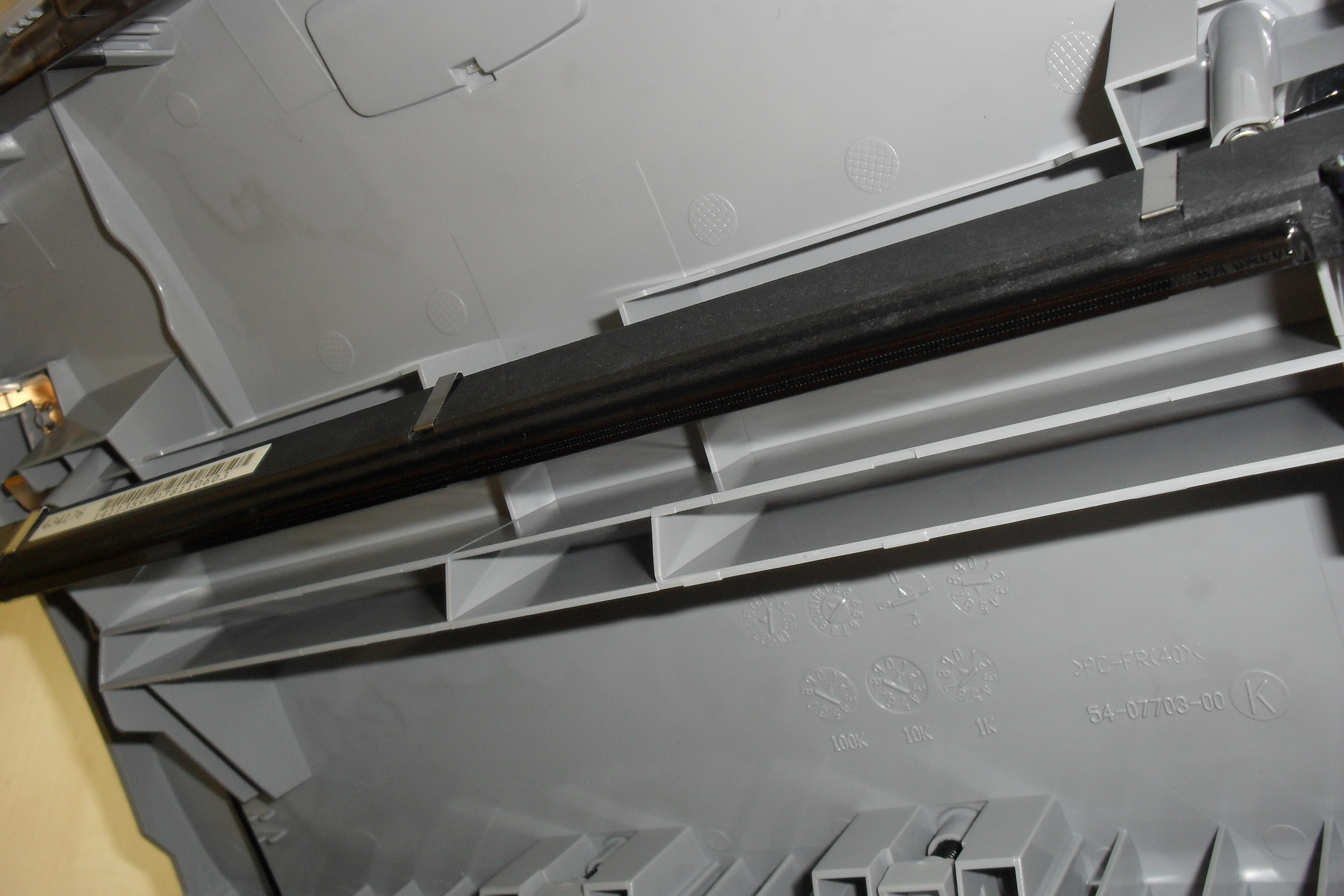
Oki LED printhead

An LED printer is a type of computer printer similar to a laser printer. Such a printer uses a light-emitting diode (LED) array as a light source in the printhead instead of the laser used in laser printers and, more generally, in the xerography process. The LED bar pulse-flashes across the entire page width and produces the image on the print drum or belt as it moves past.

LEDs are more efficient and reliable than conventional laser printers, since they have fewer moving parts, allowing for less mechanical wear. Depending on design, LED printers can have faster rates of print than some laser-based designs, and are generally cheaper to manufacture. In contrast to LED printers, laser printers require combinations of rotating mirrors and lenses that must remain in alignment throughout their use. The LED print head has no moving parts, and the individual assemblies tend to be more compact.

== History ==
Oki Electric Industry claims to have made the first LED printer in 1981. A commercialized variant called OPP6220 was developed in 1986. It was a compact monotonic printer with a resolution of 240 dpi and a speed of 16 ppm. A 1989 model called OL400 was noted for its low cost. By 1997, Oki had pushed the resolution to 1200 dpi, and had produced upscaled models handling A3-sized paper. The OKIPAGE 8c from 1998 was the first color LED printer for OKI. It simply utilizes a tandem array of four LED-toner pairs.

Fuji Xerox made a development of the LED printhead called S-LED (self-scanning LED) in 2010, which aims to provide a print quality similar to laser printheads. It achieves a print resolution of 1200×2400 DPI. Further developments from Fujifilm Business Innovation (formerly Fuji Xerox) include a 2400×2400 DPI LED printhead claimed as the world's first "high-resolution" LED printhead, introduced in 2023.

== Variants ==
OKI Data has developed specialty LED printers that use a CMYW toner system rather than CMYK. The OKI 920WT and 711WT have been developed for apparel-decorating processes, replacing the typical black toners ("K") with a white toner. The purpose is to allow the heat transfer application to dark fabrics and maintain the vibrancy of the colors. The LED immediately prints and dries the full color image onto a velum-like material, which is then heat-pressed to an adhesive sheet for application.

In 2024, Canon developed a printing technology named "D2 Exposure" that uses OLEDs instead of regular LEDs to expose the image on the drum. It provides a resolution of up to 4800×2400 DPI, and was introduced with the imageFORCE C7165 office color multifunction printer in late 2024.
