= Ronald F. Borelli =

American inventor (1936–2006)

- Born: May 26, 1936
- Died: July 10, 2006 (aged 70)
- Scientific career
- Fields: physics, xerography

Ronald F. Borelli (May 26, 1936 – June 10, 2006) was an American Engineer, Inventor and Executive born in New Haven, Connecticut.

He is known for leading the Page Printing System program at Honeywell Information Systems, that produced one of the world's first high speed electro-static non-impact computer printers. During his time at Honeywell he authored 20 patents. He also led Aavid Thermal Technologies, during a period of dramatic growth in the 1990s.

== Education ==
In 1955 Ronald graduated from Notre Dame High School in West Haven, Connecticut. He then served in the U.S. Army for two years, after which he attended Fairfield University, completing a Bachelor of Science degree in physics. He also attended Northeastern University where he completed a master's degree in electrical engineering in 1969.

== Business life ==
Ronald started his career at Univac in Norwalk Connecticut as a Computer Peripheral Engineer.

Ronald joined Honeywell in 1962. He initially worked on card readers, card punches and high speed line printers. In April 1966 he contributed to a paper delivered to the AFIPS Spring Joint Computer Conference entitled A serial reader-punch with novel concepts, that detailed design improvements incorporated into the Honeywell 214 Reader-Punch.

He joined the Page Printing System (PPS) program in 1967. Their goal was to pioneer non-impact printing as a way to reduce the noise and exceed the speed of mechanical line printers at that time. He was first the Manager of non-impact Printer Engineering based in Oklahoma City and then in 1976 he was named Director of Operations Page Printing Systems. The PPS Operation was run as a separate company within the Honeywell Corporation with its own manufacturing, research and development and marketing teams with 75 marketing (sales) personnel. During this time Ron authored 20 patents and oversaw the product as it grew to become an international operation. Ronald was routinely mentioned in the media and even appeared in print advertisements. For the Honeywell PPSII/E, he was pictured with a dog under the caption that the PPSII/E does everything but feed the dog.

Ronald left Honeywell in 1982 to join SCI of Huntsville, as Senior Vice President.

In 1989 he became president and chief executive officer of Spectra, Inc. of Hanover, NH.

He joined the Board of Directors of Aavid Thermal Technologies of Laconia, NH, in 1993, and then became chairman and CEO in October 1996. During his tenure, revenues at Aavid grew from $100m to $210m USD and employees doubled from 1000 to 2000. Aavid later moved to private ownership in 2000 after a leveraged buyout of $360 million by Chicago-based Willis Stein & Partners.

In 2004 Ronald and his former COO from Aavid, George Dannecker, created a startup called Vette Corporation. He served as chairman of the board for Vette Corporation of Manchester, New Hampshire, as well as InterSense of Burlington, Massachusetts, and Bentley Kinetics of Bedford, New Hampshire.

In 1998 he was named New Hampshire Magazine's Business Man of the Year, appearing on the cover of the magazine.

== Scholarship fund ==
Ronald also served on the Board of Trustees of Community College System of New Hampshire as well as serving as chairman of the Community Colleges of New Hampshire Foundation. While there he founded a legacy scholarship program to assist committed students further their careers.

== Personal life ==
Ronald had one brother, Robert. Ronald was married to Rose Marie (Garcia) for 45 years. He had two daughters, Donna Ebert and Michelle Arbour as well as four grandchildren at the time of his death.
