= Xerox 9700 =

1982 monochrome laser printer

Xerox 9700 Electronic Printing System

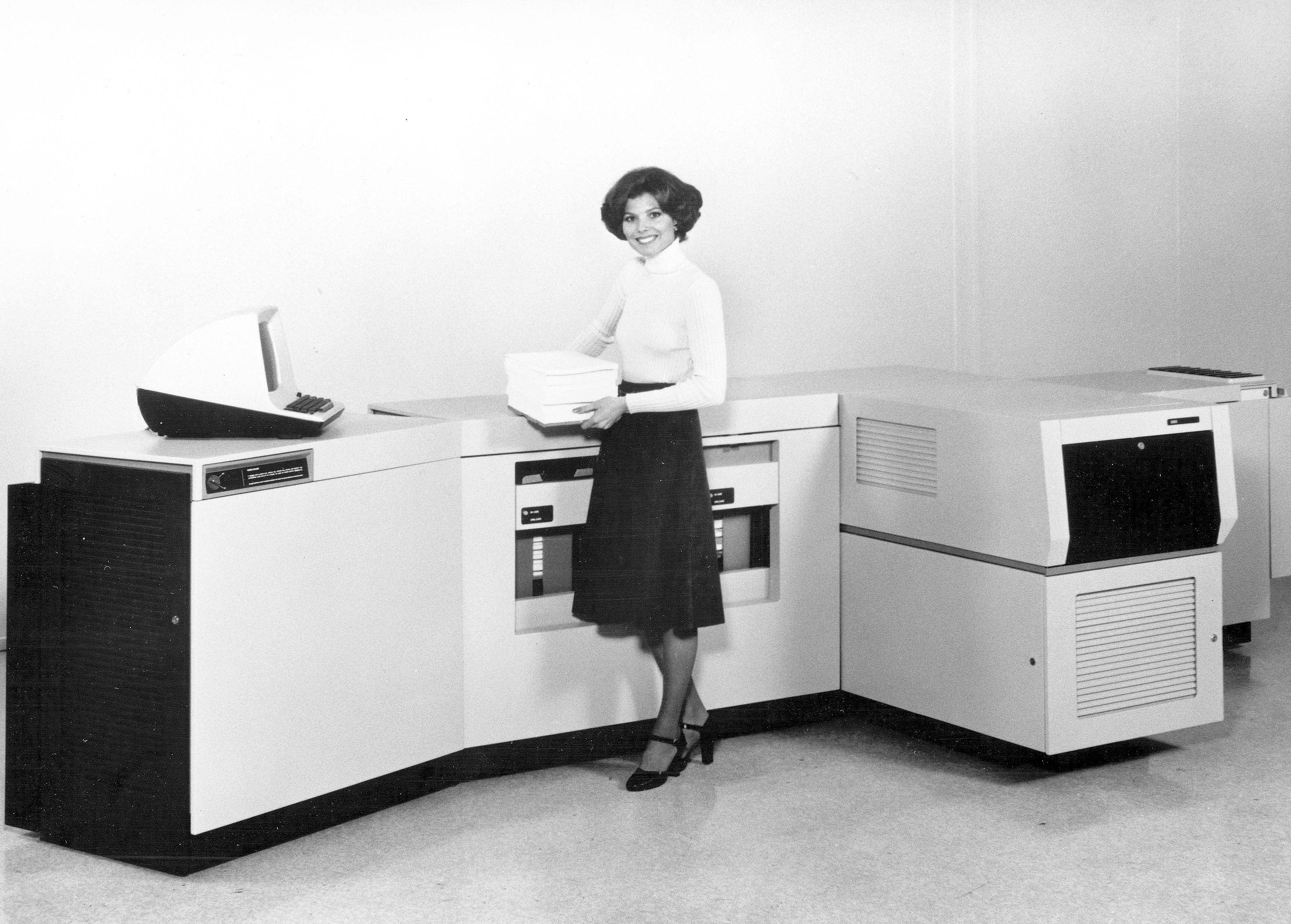
- A promotional photo of a woman in front of a Xerox 9700.
- Introduced: 1976; 50 years ago
- Type: Laser printer
- Dots per inch: 300x300
- Speed: 120ppm

The Xerox 9700 Electronic Printing System was a high-end laser printer manufactured by Xerox Corporation beginning in 1975. Based on the Xerox 9200 copier, the 9700 printed at 300 dots-per-inch on cut-sheet paper at up to two pages per second (pps), one- or two-sided, that is simplex or duplex, landscape or portrait.

== Development ==
Development of the laser printing technology behind the Xerox 9700 began in the late 1960s and was led by Gary Starkweather, with Butler Lampson and Ron Rider.

It was the successor product to the Xerox 1200 Computer Printing System.

== Description ==
The 9700 was intended for high-volume applications. It included a disk drive and a modified Digital Equipment Corporation (DEC) PDP-11/34 as a print controller and rasterizer. It could connect to an IBM mainframe via a Bus and Tag channel. It offered an input tray that could hold up to 2500 sheets of paper (20lb bond/75gsm) and an auxiliary input tray for an additional 400 sheets. It had two output stackers, each capable of holding 1500 sheets. An operator control console consisted of a CRT display terminal and keyboard. It optionally included a 9-track tape drive which could be used to load documents for printing, to supply software and bitmapped fonts, or run backups.

The 9700 had separate imaging units for each side of the paper, which allowed it to print simplex or duplex with no decrease in speed.

When used online with an IBM mainframe running OS/VS1 or MVS, the SYSOUT parameter of JCL could be used to designate both a class of output and the forms to be used in printing. Typically, SYSOUT=X was used as the class for Xerox print output.

The Xerox 9700 could also be used in off-line mode in conjunction with a DECSYSTEM-20 mainframe computer, as well as with a Honeywell DPS-8 mainframe and DEC VAX-11 superminicomputers.

== Marketing and use ==
The Xerox 9700 was very successful commercially, accounting for over $1 billion in sales per annum and becoming one of the best-selling products in Xerox's history.

The Xerox 9700 could handle corporate printing jobs that previously needed conventional printing presses or that were sent to outside printing services. The Xerox 9700 greatly increased printing throughput at sites that used it. In particular, the ability to print in duplex mode significantly reduced paper costs at those sites.

By the mid-1980s, the Xerox 9700 could be used for printing the output of a number of different personal computer word processing programs, as was done at the University of Michigan.

As a history of computing at Columbia University has written, "Even after more sophisticated typesetting methods became available, the X9700 remained in service as a high-volume printer; nothing else could push paper quite like it."

The Xerox 9700 was discontinued as a product in 1997.

== Legacy ==
The Xerox 9700 played an important role in the creation of the digital printing industry. A story in the Wall Street Journal credited Starkweather's invention as having "revolutionized computer printing". A director for KeyPoint Intelligence said that, "The Xerox 9700 helped usher in the wave of computer-driven automation in the 1970s that transformed offices, data centers, copy departments, and ultimately, the printing industry around the world. Much of how we communicate in hard copy today can be traced back to this remarkable product."

The Xerox 9700 played an incidental part in the beginning of the Free Software movement: In 1980, Richard Stallman and some other hackers at the MIT AI Lab were refused access to the source code for the software of a newly installed Xerox 9700. Stallman had modified the software for the Lab's prior Xerox Graphics Printer, a xerographic experimental raster printer, so it electronically messaged a user when the person's job was printed, and would message all logged-in users waiting for print jobs if the printer was jammed. Not being able to add these features to the new printer was a major inconvenience, as the printer was on a different floor from most of the users. This experience convinced Stallman of people's need to be able to freely modify the software they use, thus the launch of the Free Software movement.

== See also ==
- DocuTech
