= Laser printing =

Electrostatic digital printing process

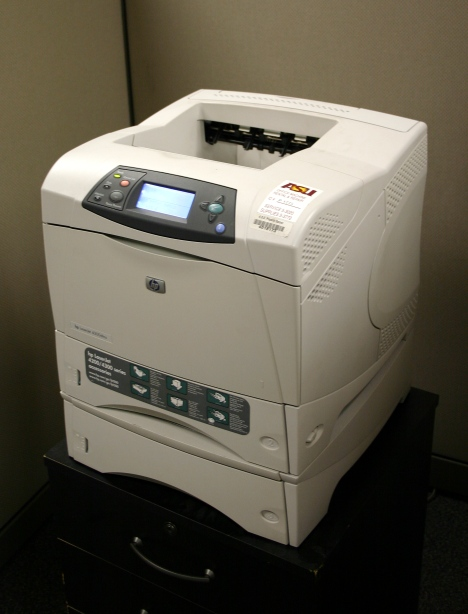
HP LaserJet 4200 series printer, installed atop additional 500-sheet paper tray

Laser printing is an electrostatic digital printing process. It produces high-quality text and graphics (and moderate-quality photographs) by repeatedly passing a laser beam back and forth over a negatively charged cylinder called a "drum" to define a differentially charged image. The drum then selectively collects electrically charged powdered ink (toner), and transfers the image to paper, which is then heated to permanently fuse the text, imagery, or both to the paper. As with digital photocopiers, laser printers employ a xerographic printing process. Laser printing differs from traditional xerography as implemented in analog photocopiers in that in the latter, the image is formed by reflecting light off an existing document onto the photoconductor drum.

The laser printer was invented at Xerox PARC in the 1970s. Laser printers were introduced for the office and then home markets in subsequent years by IBM, Canon, Xerox, Apple, Hewlett-Packard and many others. Over the decades, quality and speed have increased as prices have decreased, and the once cutting-edge printing devices are now ubiquitous.

== History ==
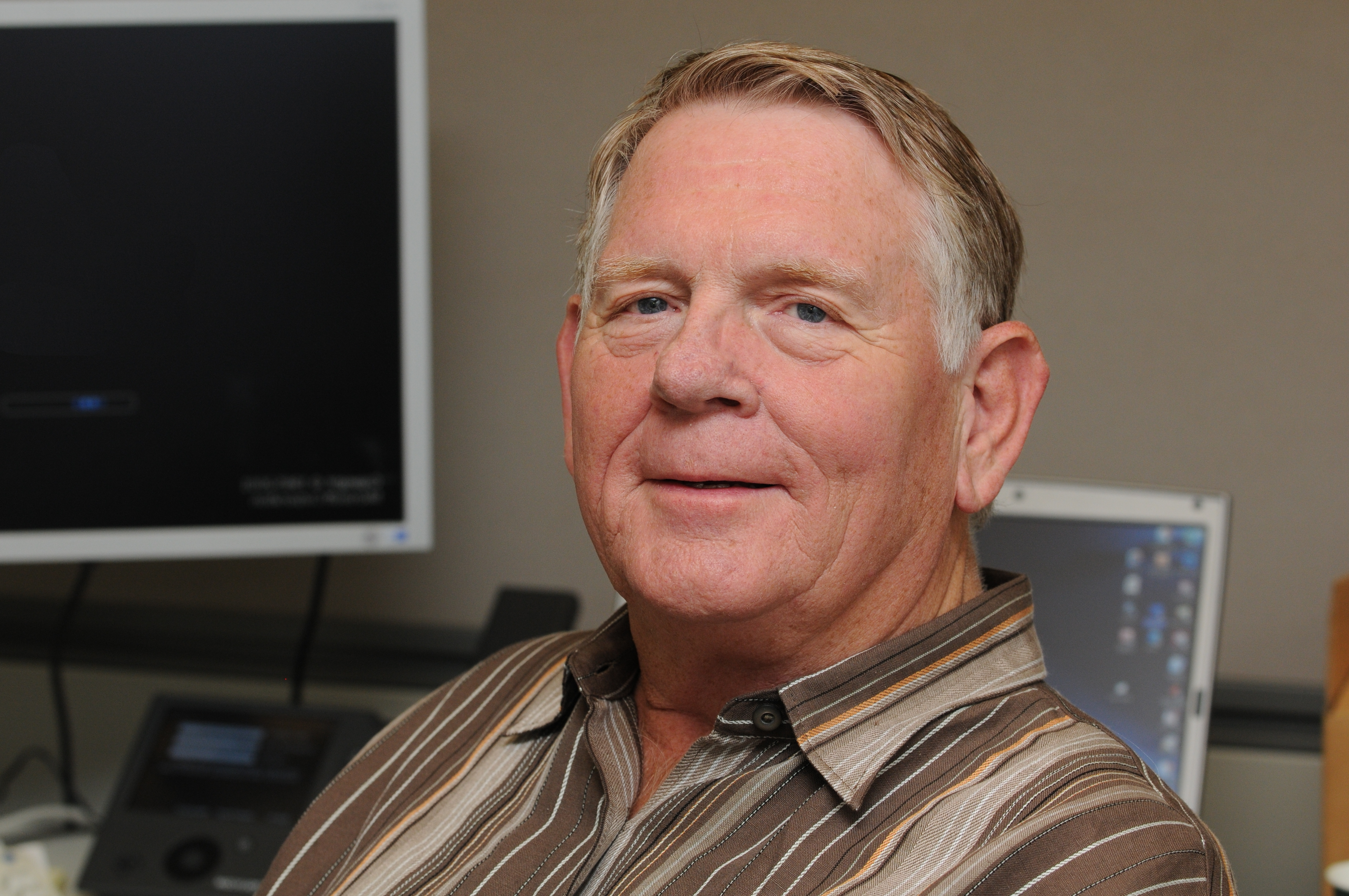
Gary Starkweather (seen here in 2009) invented the laser printer.

In the 1960s, the Xerox Corporation held a dominant position in the photocopier market. In 1969, Gary Starkweather, who worked in Xerox's product development department, had the idea of using a laser beam to "draw" an image of what was to be copied directly onto the copier drum. After transferring to the recently formed Palo Alto Research Center (Xerox PARC) in 1971, Starkweather adapted a Xerox 7000 copier to make SLOT (Scanned Laser Output Terminal). In 1972, Starkweather worked with Butler Lampson and Ronald Rider to add a control system and character generator, resulting in a printer called EARS (Ethernet, Alto Research character generator, Scanned laser output terminal)—which later became the Xerox 9700 laser printer. In 1976, the first commercial implementation of a laser printer, the IBM 3800, was released. It was designed for data centers, where it replaced line printers attached to mainframe computers. The IBM 3800 was used for high-volume printing on continuous stationery, and achieved speeds of 215 pages per minute (ppm), at a resolution of 240 dots per inch (dpi). Over 8,000 of these printers were sold.

Soon after, in 1977, the Xerox 9700 was brought to market. Unlike the IBM 3800, the Xerox 9700 was not targeted to replace any particular existing printers; however, it did have limited support for the loading of fonts. The Xerox 9700 excelled at printing high-value documents on cut-sheet paper with varying content (e.g., insurance policies). Inspired by the Xerox 9700's commercial success, Japanese camera and optics company Canon developed in 1979 the Canon LBP-10, a low-cost desktop laser printer. Canon then began work on a much-improved print engine, the Canon CX, resulting in the LBP-CX printer. Having no experience in selling to computer users, Canon sought partnerships with three Silicon Valley companies: Diablo Data Systems (who rejected the offer), Hewlett-Packard (HP), and Apple Computer.

In 1981, the first small personal computer designed for office use, the Xerox Star 8010, reached market. The system used a desktop metaphor that was unsurpassed in commercial sales, until the Apple Macintosh. Although it was innovative, the Star workstation was a prohibitively expensive (US$17,000) system, affordable only to a fraction of the businesses and institutions at which it was targeted. Later, in 1984, the first laser printer intended for mass-market sales, the HP LaserJet, was released; it used the Canon CX engine, controlled by HP software. The LaserJet was quickly followed by printers from Brother Industries, IBM, and others. First-generation machines had large photosensitive drums, of circumference greater than the loaded paper's length. Once faster-recovery coatings were developed, the drums could touch the paper multiple times in a pass, and therefore be smaller in diameter. A year later, Apple introduced the LaserWriter (also based on the Canon CX engine), but used the newly released PostScript page-description language (up until this point, each manufacturer used its own proprietary page-description language, making the supporting software complex and expensive). PostScript allowed the use of text, fonts, graphics, images, and color largely independent of the printer's brand or resolution. PageMaker, developed by Aldus for the Macintosh and LaserWriter, was also released in 1985 and the combination became very popular for desktop publishing. Laser printers brought exceptionally fast and high-quality text printing in multiple fonts on a page, to the business and home markets. No other commonly available printer during this era could also offer this combination of features.

== Printing process ==
A laser beam projects an image of the page to be printed onto an electrically charged, photoconductive, rotating, cylindrical drum. Photoconductivity conducts charged electrons away from the areas exposed to laser light. Powdered ink (toner) particles are then electrostatically attracted to remaining areas of the drum that have not been laser-beamed.

The drum then transfers the image onto paper which is passed through the machine by direct contact. Finally, the paper is passed onto a finisher, which uses heat to instantly fuse the toner that represents the image onto the paper.

The laser is typically an aluminium gallium arsenide (AlGaAs) semiconductor laser, which emits red or infrared light.

The drum is coated with selenium, or more recently, with an organic photoconductor made of N-vinylcarbazole, an organic monomer.

There are typically seven steps involved in the process, detailed in the sections below.

Diagram of a laser printer

The sound of a laser printer

=== Raster image processing ===
The document to be printed is encoded in a page description language such as PostScript, Printer Command Language (PCL), or Open XML Paper Specification (OpenXPS). The raster image processor (RIP) converts the page description into a bitmap which is stored in the printer's raster memory. Each horizontal strip of dots across the page is known as a raster line or scan line.

Laser printing differs from other printing technologies in that each page is always rendered in a single continuous process without any pausing in the middle, while other technologies like inkjet can pause every few lines. To avoid a buffer underrun (where the laser reaches a point on the page before it has the dots to draw there), a laser printer typically needs enough raster memory to hold the bitmap image of an entire page.

Memory requirements increase with the square of the dots per inch, so 600 dpi requires a minimum of 4 megabytes for monochrome, and 16 megabytes for color (still at 600 dpi). For fully graphical output using a page description language, a minimum of 1 megabyte of memory is needed to store an entire monochrome letter- or A4-sized page of dots at 300 dpi. At 300 dpi, there are 90,000 dots per square inch (300 dots per linear inch). A typical 8.5 × 11 sheet of paper has 0.25-inch (6.4 mm) margins, reducing the printable area to 8.0 by 10.5 inches (200 mm × 270 mm), or 84 square inches. 84 sq/in × 90,000 dots per sq/in = 7,560,000 dots. 1 megabyte = 1,048,576 bytes, or 8,388,608 bits, which is just large enough to hold the entire page at 300 dpi, leaving about 100 kilobytes to spare for use by the raster image processor.

In a color printer, each of the four CMYK toner layers is stored as a separate bitmap, and all four layers are typically preprocessed before printing begins, so a minimum of 4 megabytes is needed for a full-color letter-size or A4-size page at 300 dpi.

During the 1980s, memory chips were still very expensive, which is why entry-level laser printers in that era always came with four-digit suggested retail prices in US dollars. The primitive microprocessors in early personal computers were so underpowered and insufficient for graphics work that attached laser printers usually had more onboard processing power. Memory prices later decreased significantly, while rapid improvements in the performance of PCs and peripheral cables (most importantly, SCSI) enabled the development of low-end laser printers which offload rasterization to the sending PC. For such printers, the operating system's print spooler renders the raw bitmap of each page into the PC's system memory at the target resolution, then sends that bitmap directly to the laser (at the expense of slowing down all other programs on the sending PC). The appearance of so-called "dumb" or "host-based" laser printers from NEC made it possible for the retail cost of low-end 300-dpi laser printers to decrease to as low as US$700 by early 1994 and US$600 by early 1995. In September 1997, HP introduced the host-based LaserJet 6L, which could print 600 dpi text at up to six pages per minute for only US$400.

1200 dpi printers have been widely available in the home market since 2008. 2400 dpi electrophotographic printing plate makers, essentially laser printers that print on plastic sheets, are also available.

=== Charging ===
Applying a negative charge to the photosensitive drum

In older printers, a corona wire positioned parallel to the drum or, in more recent printers, a primary charge roller, projects an electrostatic charge onto the photoreceptor (otherwise named the photoconductor unit), a revolving photosensitive drum or belt, which is capable of holding an electrostatic charge on its surface while it is in the dark.

An AC bias voltage is applied to the primary charge roller to remove any residual charges left by previous images. The roller will also apply a DC bias on the drum surface to ensure a uniform negative potential.

Numerous patents describe the photosensitive drum coating as a silicon "sandwich" with a photocharging layer, a charge leakage barrier layer, as well as a surface layer. One version uses amorphous silicon containing hydrogen as the light-receiving layer, boron nitride as a charge leakage barrier layer, as well as a surface layer of doped silicon, notably silicon with oxygen or nitrogen which at sufficient concentration resembles machining silicon nitride.

=== Exposing ===
Laser light selectively neutralizes the negative charge on the photoreceptive drum, to form an electrostatic image.

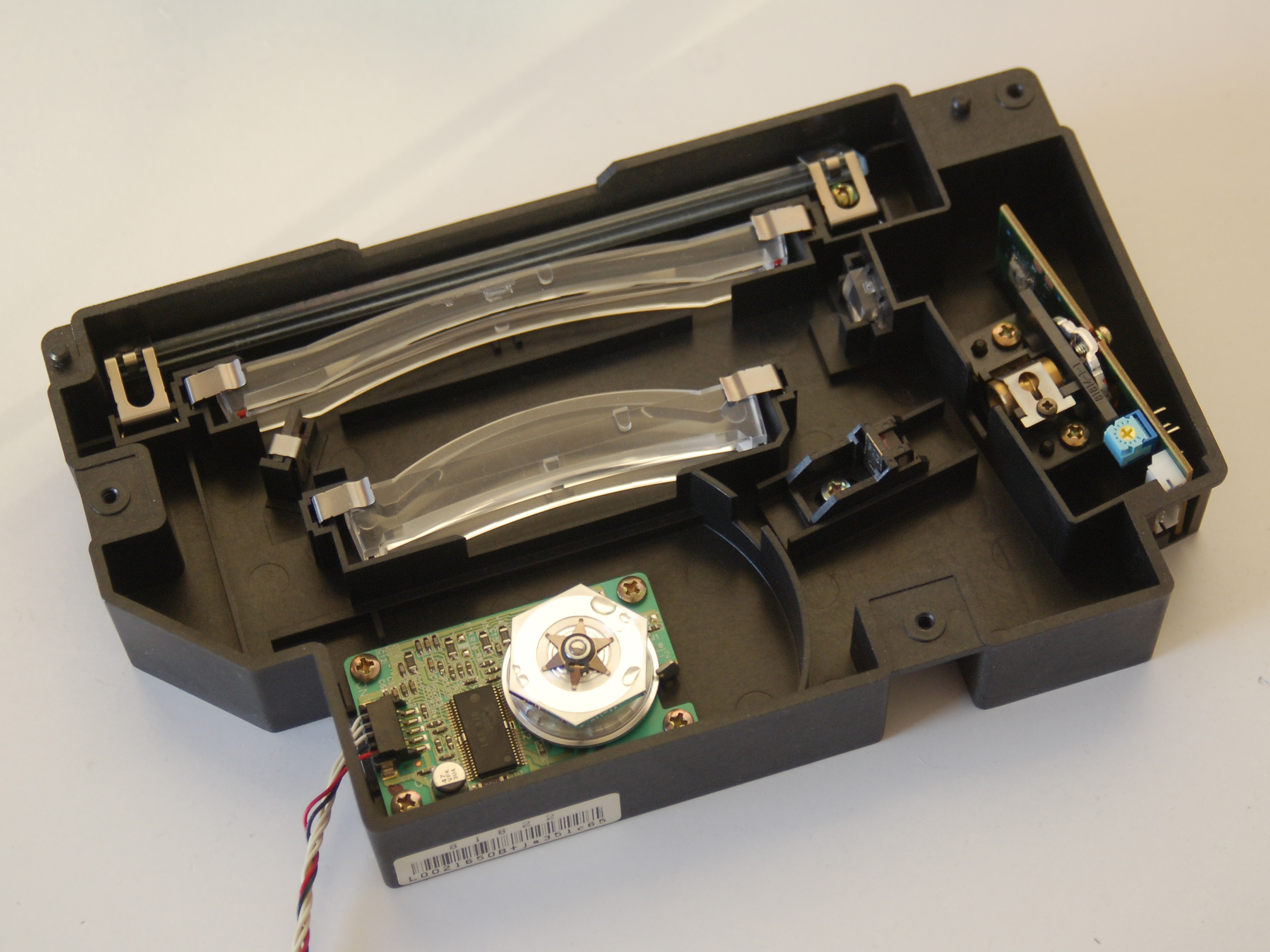
Laser unit from a Dell P1500. The white hexagon is the rotating scanner mirror.

A laser printer uses a laser because lasers are able to form highly focused, precise, and intense beams of light, especially over the short distances inside of a printer. The laser is aimed at a rotating polygonal mirror which directs the light beam through a system of lenses and mirrors onto the photoreceptor drum, writing pixels at rates up to sixty-five million times per second. The drum continues to rotate during the sweep, and the angle of sweep is canted very slightly to compensate for this motion. The stream of rasterized data held in the printer's memory rapidly turns the laser on and off as it sweeps.

The laser beam neutralizes (or reverses) the charge on the surface of the drum, leaving a static electric negative image on the drum's surface which will repel the negatively charged toner particles. The areas on the drum which were struck by the laser, however, momentarily have no charge, and the toner being pressed against the drum by the toner-coated developer roll in the next step moves from the roll's rubber surface to the charged portions of the surface of the drum.

Some non-laser printers (LED printers) use an array of light-emitting diodes spanning the width of the page to generate an image, rather than using a laser. "Exposing" is also known as "writing" in some documentation.

=== Developing ===
As the drums rotate, toner is continuously applied in a 15-micron-thick layer to the developer roll. The surface of the photoreceptor with the latent image is exposed to the toner-covered developer roll.

Toner consists of fine particles of dry plastic powder mixed with carbon black or coloring agents. The toner particles are given a negative charge inside the toner cartridge, and as they emerge onto the developer drum they are electrostatically attracted to the photoreceptor's latent image (the areas on the surface of the drum which had been struck by the laser). Because negative charges repel each other, the negatively charged toner particles will not adhere to the drum where the negative charge (imparted previously by the charge roller) remains.

=== Transferring ===
A sheet of paper is then rolled under the photoreceptor drum, which has been coated with a pattern of toner particles in the exact places where the laser struck it moments before. The toner particles have a very weak attraction to both the drum and the paper, but the bond to the drum is weaker and the particles transfer once again, this time from the drum's surface to the paper's surface. Some machines also use a positively charged "transfer roller" on the backside of the paper to help pull the negatively charged toner from the photoreceptor drum to the paper.

=== Fusing ===
Toner is fused onto paper with heat and pressure.

The paper passes through rollers in the fuser assembly, where temperatures up to 427 °C (801 °F) and pressure are used to permanently bond the toner to the paper. One roller is usually a hollow tube (heat roller) and the other is a rubber-backed roller (pressure roller). A radiant heat lamp is suspended in the center of the hollow tube, and its infrared energy uniformly heats the roller from the inside. For proper bonding of the toner, the fuser roller must be uniformly hot.

Some printers use a very thin flexible metal foil roller, so there is less thermal mass to be heated and the fuser can more quickly reach operating temperature. If paper moves through the fuser more slowly, there is more roller contact time for the toner to melt, and the fuser can operate at a lower temperature. Smaller, inexpensive laser printers typically print slowly, due to this energy-saving design, compared to large high-speed printers where paper moves more rapidly through a high-temperature fuser with very short contact time.

=== Cleaning and recharging ===
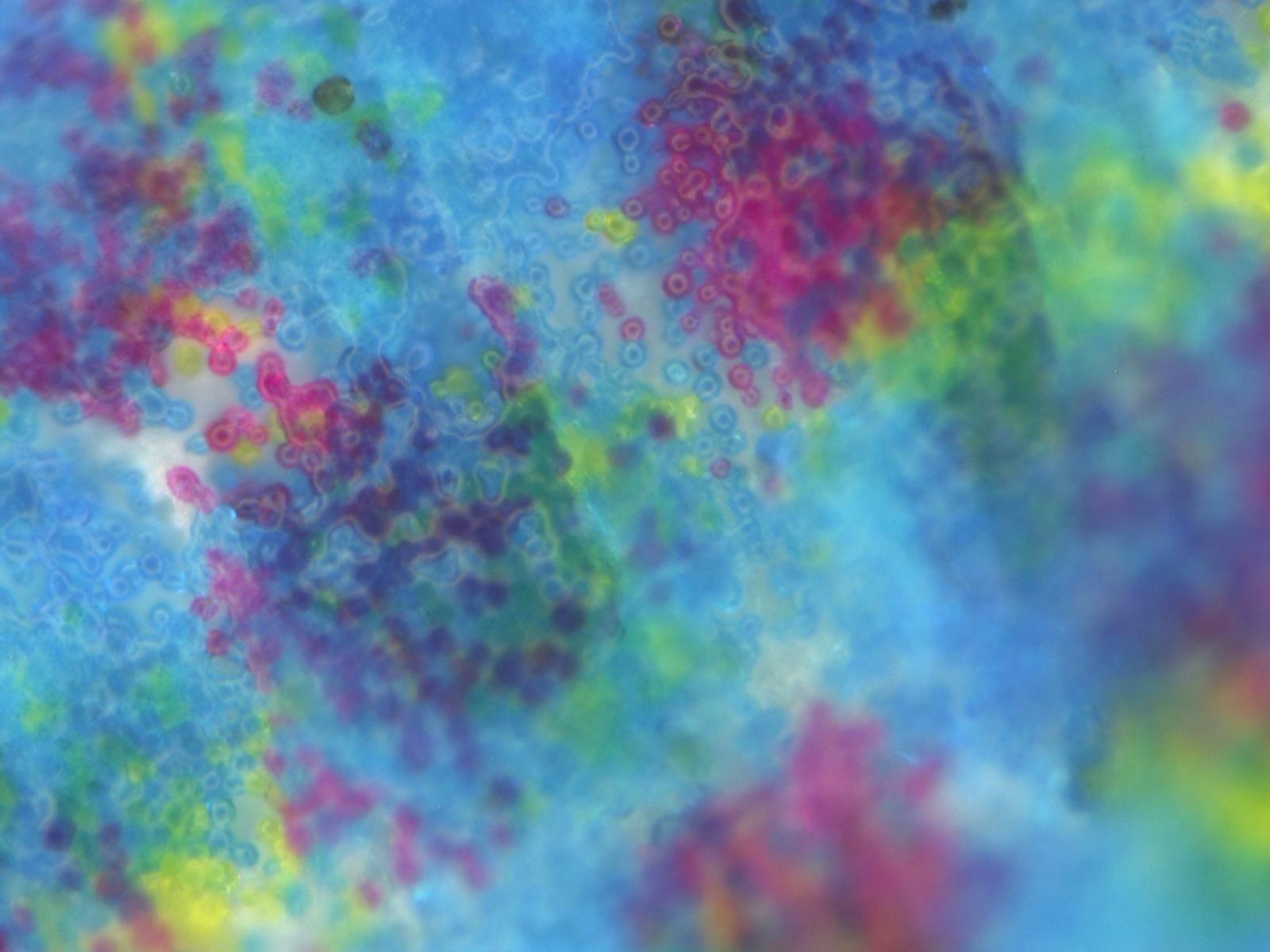
Magnification of color laser printer output, showing individual toner particles comprising 4 dots of an image with a bluish background

As the drum completes a revolution, it is exposed to an electrically neutral soft plastic blade that cleans any remaining toner from the photoreceptor drum and deposits it into a waste reservoir. A charge roller then re-establishes a uniform negative charge on the surface of the now-clean drum, readying it to be struck again by the laser.

=== Continuous printing ===
Once the raster image generation is complete, all steps of the printing process can occur one after the other in rapid succession. This permits the use of a very small and compact unit, where the photoreceptor is charged, rotates a few degrees and is scanned, rotates a few more degrees, and is developed, and so forth. The entire process can be completed before the drum completes one revolution.

Different printers implement these steps in distinct ways. LED printers use a linear array of light-emitting diodes to "write" the light on the drum. The toner is based on either wax or plastic, so that when the paper passes through the fuser assembly, the particles of toner melt. The paper may or may not be oppositely charged. The fuser can be an infrared oven, a heated pressure roller, or (on some very fast, expensive printers) a xenon flash lamp. The warmup process that a laser printer goes through when power is initially applied to the printer consists mainly of heating the fuser element.

=== Malfunctions ===
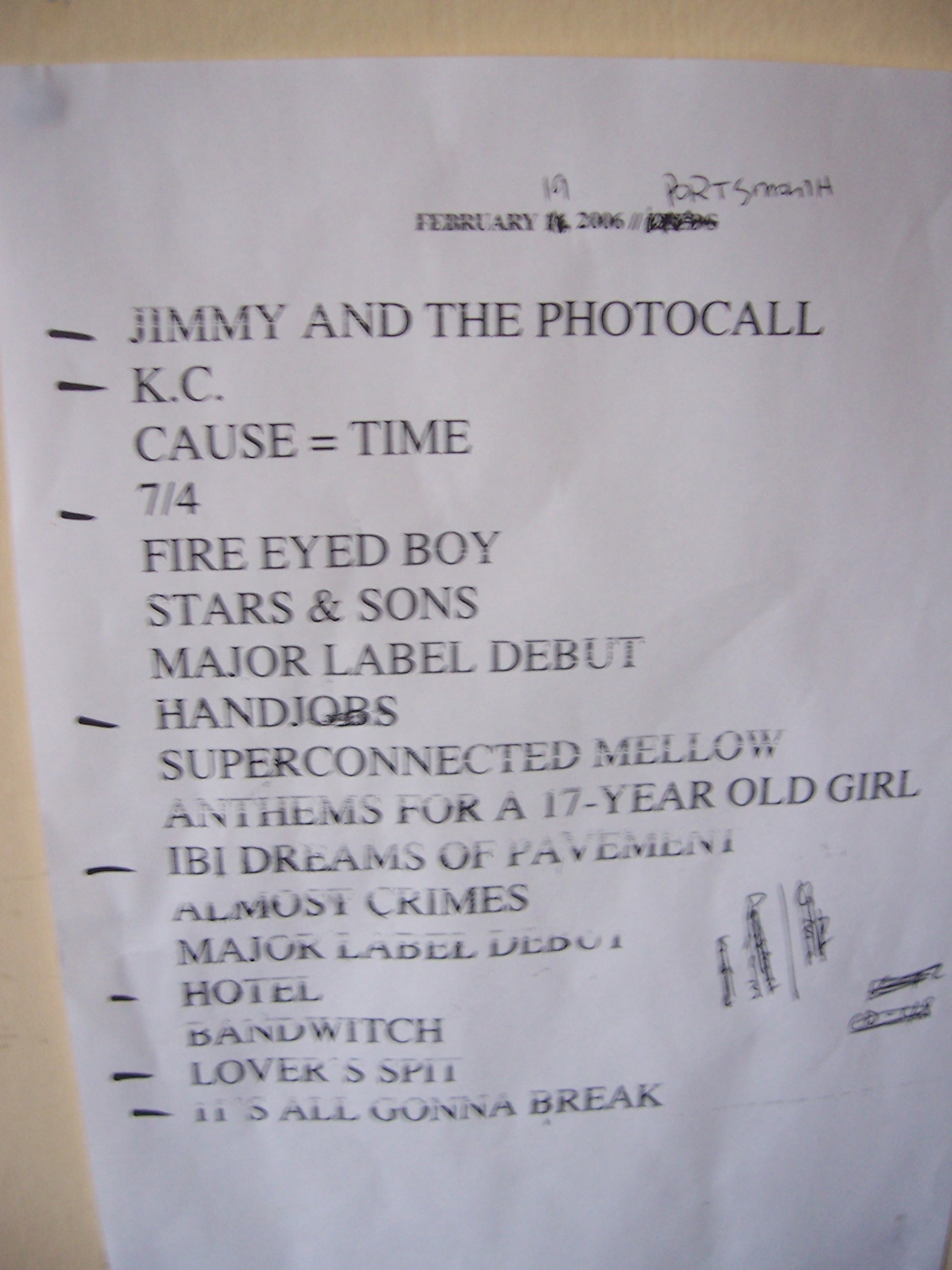
Laser print with lines due to empty toner

The mechanism inside a laser printer is somewhat delicate and, once damaged, often impossible to repair. The drum, in particular, is a critical component: it must not be left exposed to ambient light for more than a few hours, as light is what causes it to lose its charge and will eventually wear it out. Anything that interferes with the operation of the laser such as a scrap of torn paper may prevent the laser from discharging some portion of the drum, causing those areas to appear as white vertical streaks. If the neutral wiper blade fails to remove residual toner from the drum's surface, that toner may circulate on the drum a second time, causing smears on the printed page with each revolution. If the charge roller becomes damaged or does not have enough power, it may fail to adequately negatively charge the surface of the drum, allowing the drum to pick up excessive toner on the next revolution from the developer roll and causing a repeated but fainter image from the previous revolution to appear down the page.

If the toner doctor blade does not ensure that a smooth, even layer of toner is applied to the developer roll, the resulting printout may have white streaks from this in places where the blade has scraped off too much toner. Alternatively, if the blade allows too much toner to remain on the developer roll, the toner particles might come loose as the roll turns, precipitate onto the paper below, and become bonded to the paper during the fusing process. This will result in a general darkening of the printed page in broad vertical stripes with very soft edges.

If the fuser roller does not reach a high enough temperature or if the ambient humidity is too high, the toner will not fuse well to the paper and may flake off after printing. If the fuser is too hot, the plastic component of the toner may smear, causing the printed text to look like it is wet or smudged, or may cause the melted toner to soak through the paper to the backside.

Different manufacturers claim that their toners are specifically developed for their printers and that other toner formulations may not match the original specifications in terms of either tendency to accept a negative charge, to move to the discharged areas of the photoreceptor drum from the developer roll, to fuse appropriately to the paper, or to come off the drum cleanly in each revolution.

== Performance ==
As with most electronic devices, the cost of laser printers has decreased significantly over the years. In 1984, the HP LaserJet sold for $3500, had trouble with even small, low-resolution graphics, and weighed 32 kg (71 lb). By the late 1990s, monochrome laser printers had become inexpensive enough for home-office use, having displaced other printing technologies, although color inkjet printers (see below) still had advantages in photo quality reproduction. As of 2016, low-end monochrome laser printers can sell for less than $75, and while these printers tend to lack onboard processing and rely on the host computer to generate a raster image, they nonetheless outperform the 1984 LaserJet in nearly all situations.

Laser printer speed can vary widely, and depends on many factors, including the graphic intensity of the job being processed. The fastest models can print over 200 monochrome pages per minute (12,000 pages per hour). The fastest color laser printers can print over 100 pages per minute (6000 pages per hour). Very high-speed laser printers are used for mass mailings of personalized documents, such as credit card or utility bills, and are competing with lithography in some commercial applications.

The cost of this technology depends on a combination of factors, including the cost of paper, toner, drum replacement, as well as the replacement of other items such as the fuser assembly and transfer assembly. Often printers with soft plastic drums can have a very high cost of ownership that does not become apparent until the drum requires replacement.

Duplex printing (printing on both sides of the paper) can halve paper costs and reduce filing volumes, albeit at a slower page-printing speed because of the longer paper path. Formerly only available on high-end printers, duplexers are now common on mid-range office printers, though not all printers can accommodate a duplexing unit.

In a commercial environment such as an office, it is becoming increasingly common for businesses to use external software that increases the performance and efficiency of laser printers in the workplace. The software can be used to set rules dictating how employees interact with printers, such as setting limits on how many pages can be printed per day, limiting usage of color ink, and flagging jobs that appear to be wasteful.

== Color laser printers ==
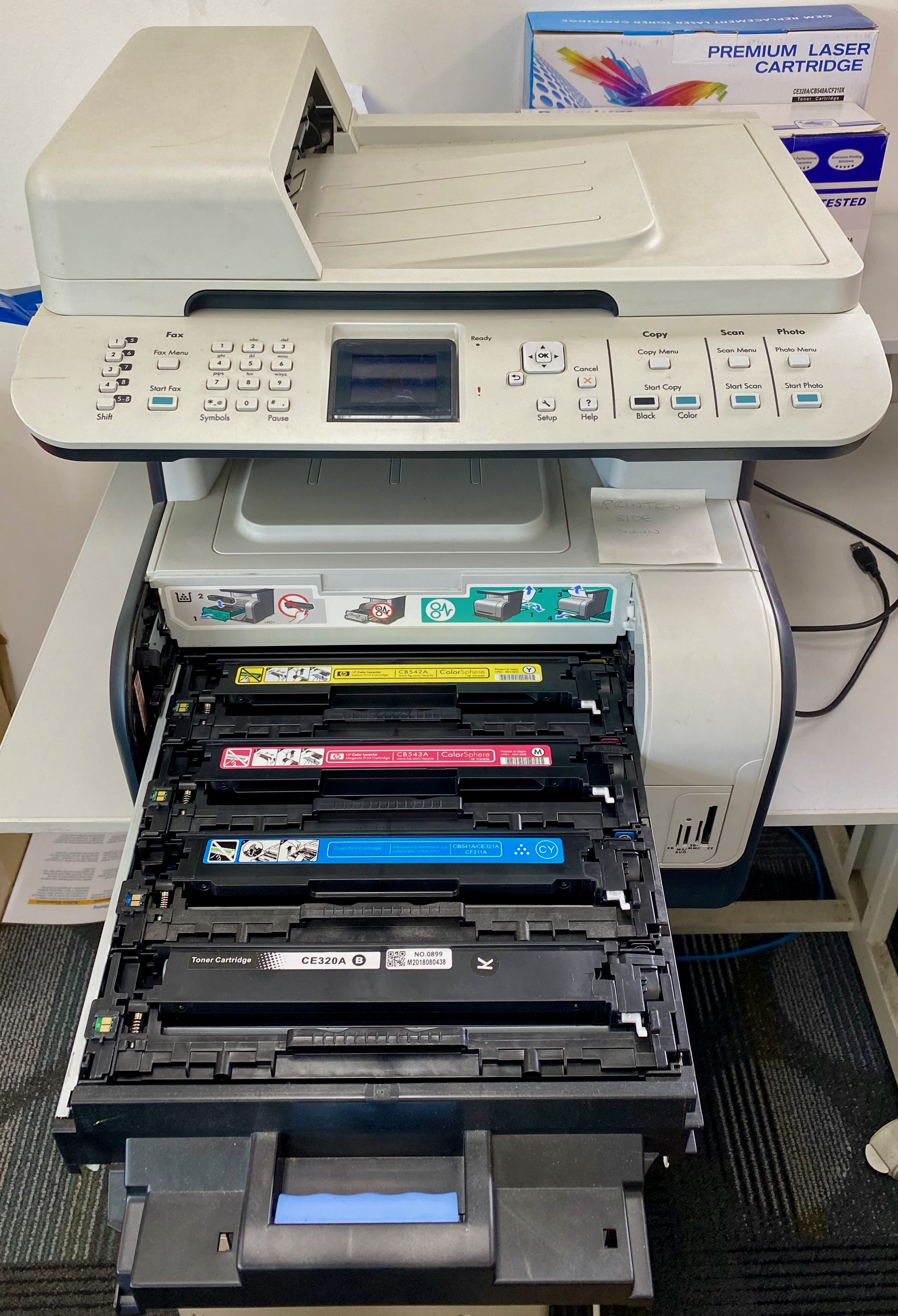
A HP color laser printer with its cartridge drawer open showing the four toner cartridges inside

Color laser printers use colored toner (dry ink), typically cyan, magenta, yellow, and black (CMYK). While monochrome printers only use one laser scanner assembly, color printers often have two or more, often one for each of the four colors.

Color printing adds complexity to the printing process because very slight misalignments known as registration errors can occur between printing each color, causing unintended color fringing, blurring, or light/dark streaking along the edges of colored regions. To permit a high registration accuracy, some color laser printers use a large rotating belt called a "transfer belt". The transfer belt passes in front of all the toner cartridges and each of the toner layers are precisely applied to the belt. The combined layers are then applied to the paper in a uniform single step.

Color printers usually have a higher cost per page than monochrome printers, even if printing monochrome-only pages.

Liquid electrophotography (LEP) is a similar process used in HP Indigo presses that uses electrostatically charged ink instead of toner, and using a heated transfer roller instead of a fuser, that melts the charged ink particles before applying them to the paper.

=== Color laser transfer printers ===
Color laser transfer printers are designed to produce transfer media which are transfer sheets designed to be applied by means of a heat press. These transfers are typically used to make custom T-shirts or custom logo products with corporate or team logos on them.

2-part Color laser transfers are part of a two-step process whereby the color laser printers use colored toner (dry ink), typically cyan, magenta, yellow, and black (CMYK); however, newer printers designed to print on dark T-shirts utilize a special white toner allowing them to make transfers for dark garments or dark business products.

The CMYK color printing process allows for millions of colors to be faithfully represented by the unique imaging process.

=== Business-model comparison with inkjet printers ===
Manufacturers use a similar business model for both low-cost color laser printers and inkjet printers: the printers are sold cheaply while replacement toners and inks are relatively expensive. A color laser printer's average running cost per page is usually slightly less, even though both the laser printer and laser toner cartridge have higher upfront prices, as laser toner cartridges print many more sheets relative to their cost than inkjet cartridges.

The print quality of color lasers is limited by their resolution (typically 600–1200 dpi) and their use of just four color toners. They often have trouble printing large areas of the same or subtle gradations of color. Inkjet printers designed for printing photos can produce much higher quality color images. An in-depth comparison of inkjet and laser printers suggest that laser printers are the ideal choice for a high quality, volume printer, while inkjet printers tend to focus on large-format printers and household units. Laser printers offer more precise edging and in-depth monochromatic color. In addition, color laser printers are much faster than inkjet printers, although being generally larger and bulkier.

=== Anti-counterfeiting marks ===
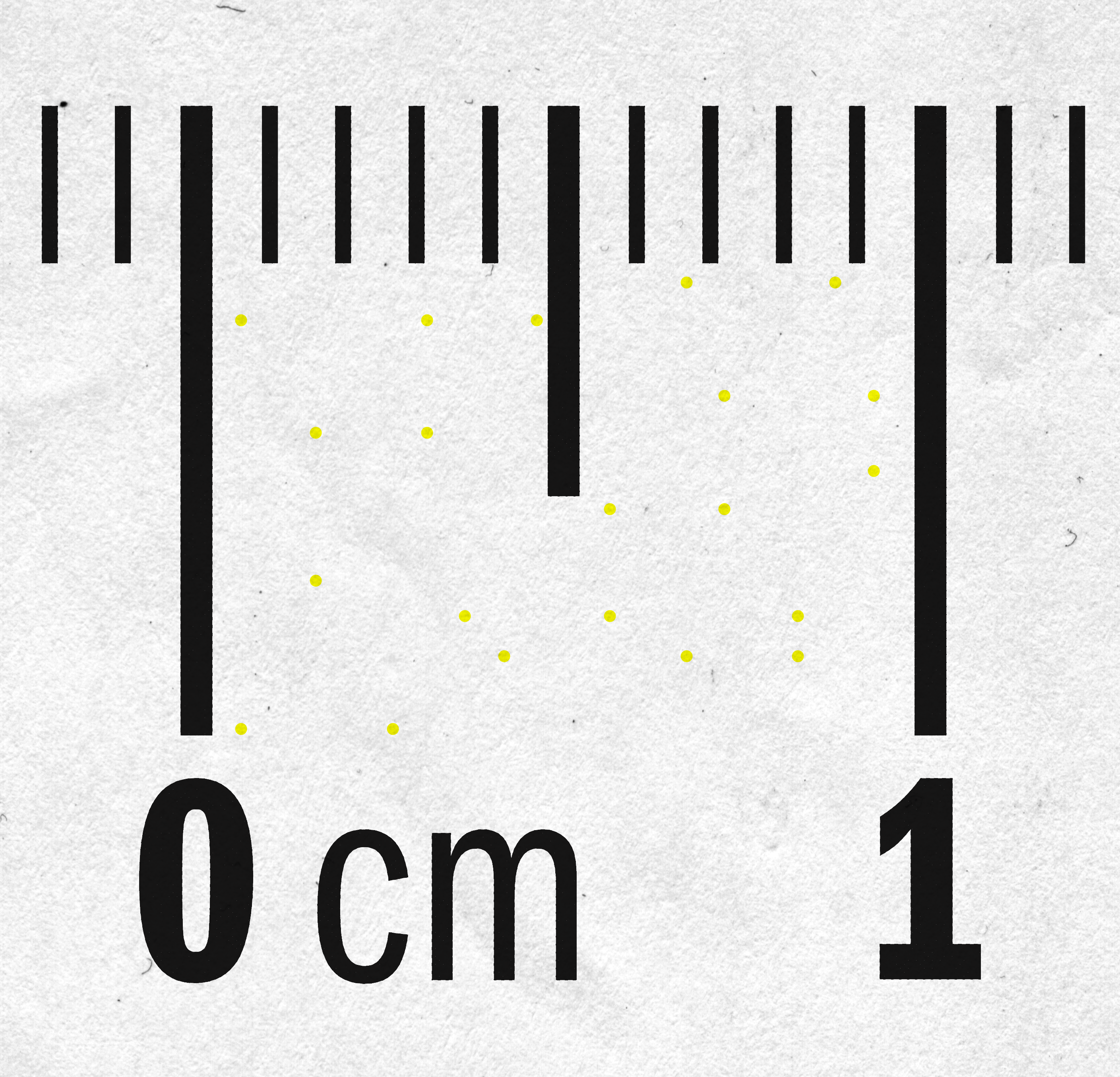
Small yellow dots on white paper, generated by a color laser printer, are nearly invisible. Click to see higher-resolution image.

Many modern color laser printers mark printouts by a nearly invisible dot raster, for the purpose of traceability. The dots are yellow and about 0.1 mm (0.0039 in) in size, with a raster of about 1 mm (0.039 in). This is purportedly the result of a deal between the US government and printer manufacturers to help track counterfeiters. The dots encode data such as printing date, time, and printer serial number in binary-coded decimal on every sheet of paper printed, which allows pieces of paper to be traced by the manufacturer to identify the place of purchase, and sometimes the buyer.

Digital-rights advocacy groups such as the Electronic Frontier Foundation are concerned about this erosion of the privacy and anonymity of those who print. In particular, the tracking dots were implicated as a tool that directly led to the arrest and conviction of whistleblower Reality Winner.

== Smart chips in toner cartridges ==
Similar to inkjet printers, toner cartridges may contain smart chips that reduce the number of pages that can be printed with it (reducing the amount of usable ink or toner in the cartridge to sometimes only 50%), in an effort to increase sales of the toner cartridges. Besides being more expensive for printer users, this technique also increases waste, and thus increases pressure on the environment. For these toner cartridges (as with inkjet cartridges), reset devices can be used to override the limitation set by the smart chip. Also, for some printers, online walk-throughs have been posted to demonstrate how to use up all the ink in the cartridge. These chips offer no benefit to the end-user—some laser printers used an optical mechanism to assess the amount of remaining toner in the cartridge rather than using a chip to electrically count the number of printed pages, and the chip's only function was as an alternate method to decrease the cartridge's usable life.

== Safety hazards, health risks, and precautions ==
=== Toner clean-up ===
Toner particles are formulated to have electrostatic properties and can develop static electric charges when they rub against other particles, objects, or the interiors of transport systems and vacuum hoses. Static discharge from charged toner particles can ignite combustible particles in a vacuum cleaner bag or cause a small dust explosion if sufficient toner is airborne. Toner particles are so fine that they are poorly filtered by conventional household vacuum cleaner filter bags and blow through the motor or back into the room.

If toner spills into the laser printer, a special type of vacuum cleaner with an electrically conductive hose and a high-efficiency (HEPA) filter may be needed for effective cleaning. These specialized tools are called "ESD-safe" (Electrostatic Discharge-safe) or "toner vacuums".

=== Ozone hazards ===
As a normal part of the printing process, the high voltages inside the printer can produce a corona discharge that generates a small amount of ionized oxygen and nitrogen, which react to form ozone and nitrogen oxides. Many photocopiers and laser printers are fitted with an activated carbon filter that breaks down ozone and noxious gases to prevent pollution of the office environment.

However, some ozone escapes the filtering process in commercial printers, and ozone filters are not used at all in most smaller home printers. When a laser printer or copier is operated for a long period of time in a small, poorly ventilated space, these gases can build up to levels at which the odor of ozone or irritation may be noticed. A potential health hazard is theoretically possible in extreme cases.

=== Respiratory health risks ===
A video on research done on printer emissions

According to a 2012 study conducted in Queensland, Australia, some printers emit sub-micrometer particles which some suspect may be associated with respiratory diseases. Of 63 printers evaluated in the Queensland University of Technology study, 17 of the strongest emitters were made by HP and one by Toshiba. The machine population studied, however, was only those machines already in place in the building and was thus biased toward specific manufacturers. The authors noted that particle emissions varied substantially even among the same model of machine. According to Professor Morawska of the Queensland University of Technology, one printer emitted as many particles as a burning cigarette:

The health effects from inhaling ultrafine particles depend on particle composition, but the results can range from respiratory irritation to more severe illness such as cardiovascular problems or cancer.

In December 2011, the Australian government agency Safe Work Australia reviewed existing research and concluded that "no epidemiology studies directly associating laser printer emissions with adverse health outcomes were located" and that several assessments conclude that "risk of direct toxicity and health effects from exposure to laser printer emissions is negligible". The review also observes that, because the emissions have been shown to be volatile or semi-volatile organic compounds, "it would be logical to expect possible health effects to be more related to the chemical nature of the aerosol rather than the physical character of the 'particulate' since such emissions are unlikely to be or remain as 'particulates' after they come into contact with respiratory tissue".

The German Social Accident Insurance has commissioned a human study project to examine the effects on health resulting from exposure to toner dusts and from photocopying and printing cycles. Volunteers (23 control persons, 15 exposed persons and 14 asthmatics) were exposed to laser printer emissions under defined conditions in an exposure chamber. The findings from the study based on a broad spectrum of processes and subjects fail to confirm that exposure to high laser printer emissions initiates a verifiable pathological process resulting in the reported illnesses.

A much-discussed proposal for reducing emissions from laser printers is to retrofit them with filters. These are fixed with adhesive tape to the printer's fan vents to reduce particle emissions. However, all printers have a paper output tray, which is an outlet for particle emissions. Paper output trays cannot be provided with filters, so it is impossible to reduce their contribution to overall emissions with retrofit filters.

=== Air-transport ban ===
After the 2010 cargo plane bomb plot, in which shipments of laser printers with explosive-filled toner cartridges were discovered on separate cargo airplanes, the US Transportation Security Administration prohibited pass-through passengers from carrying toner or ink cartridges weighing over 1 pound (0.45 kg) on inbound flights, in both carry-on and checked luggage. PC Magazine noted that the ban would not impact most travelers, as the majority of cartridges do not exceed the prescribed weight.

== See also ==
- Cardboard engineering
- Daisy wheel printer
- Document automation
- Dot matrix printer
- Dye-sublimation printer
- List of printer companies
- Solid ink
- Thermal printer
- Winprinter
