= Xerox 1200 =

Cut sheet electrographic printer designed and manufactured by Xerox

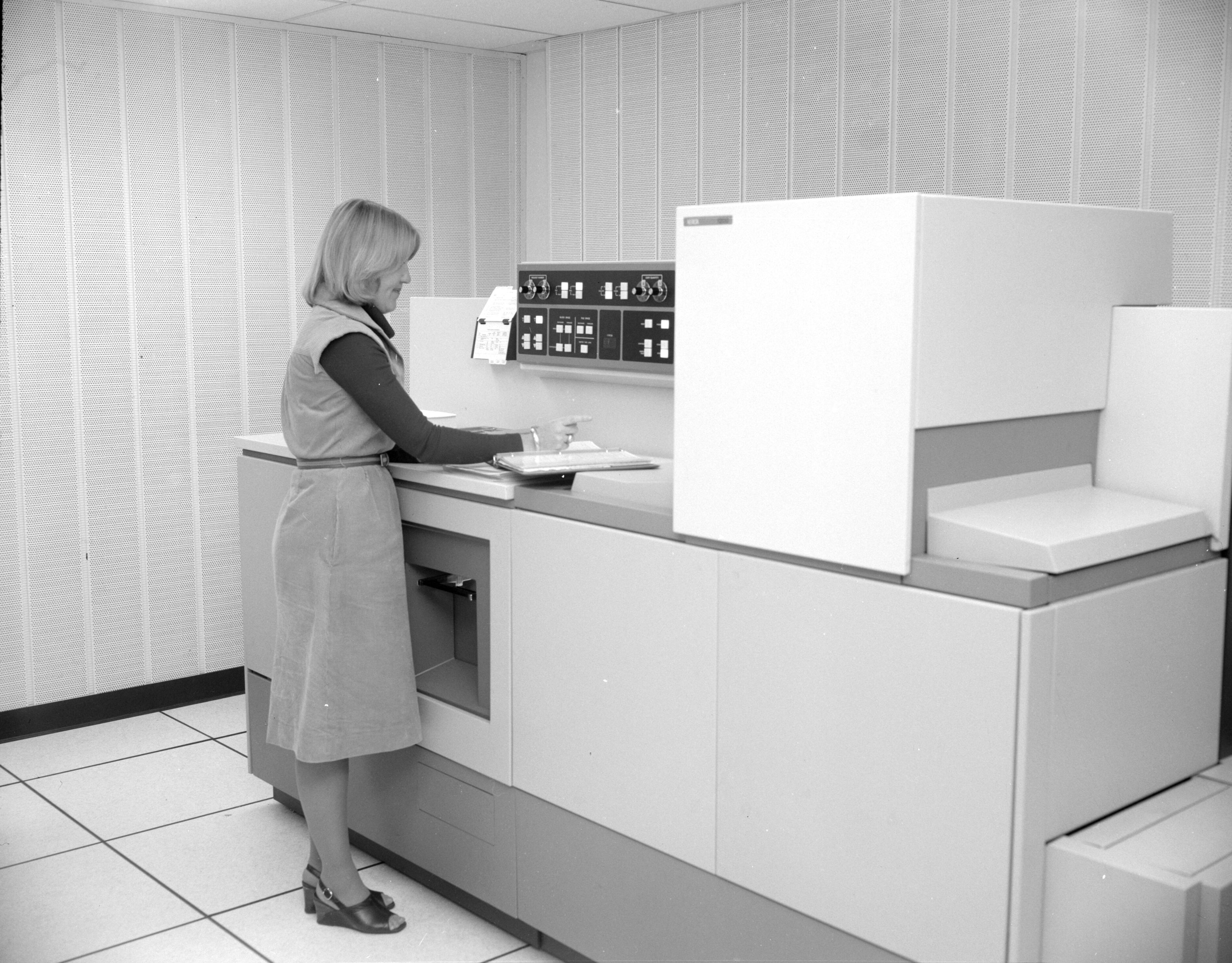
- Xerox 1200 Computer Printer
- Manufacturer: Xerox
- Introduced: 1973

The Xerox 1200 Computer Printing System is a computer printer system that was developed by Xerox. It was the first commercial non-impact Xerographic printer used to create computer output. It is sometimes mistakenly referred to as a laser printer, but it did not in fact have a laser.

== Development ==
The printing system was announced in May 1973, and was first shipped in mid to late 1974. It was based on the Xerox 3600 Copier, which was initially released in 1968 as a 60-page-per-minute copier with a 2000-sheet paper tray. It used a selenium photoconductor drum with characters positioned in a manner similar to a line printer. It used an optical character generator designed by optical engineer Phil Chen.

== Characteristics ==
The 1200 Computer Printing System was available in both an offline and an online model:

- The Model 1 is an offline version and took output from 800 or 1600 BPI 9 track magnetic tapes made on IBM systems or Univac Series 70 Systems. In May 1975 a software update added support for tapes from Burroughs and Honeywell mainframes. The attraction of offline printing from tape was that it reduced CPU utilization.
- The Model 2 is both online and offline.
- The Model 3 is an online version and can be attached to Xerox Sigma 6, Sigma 7 and Sigma 9 computer systems.

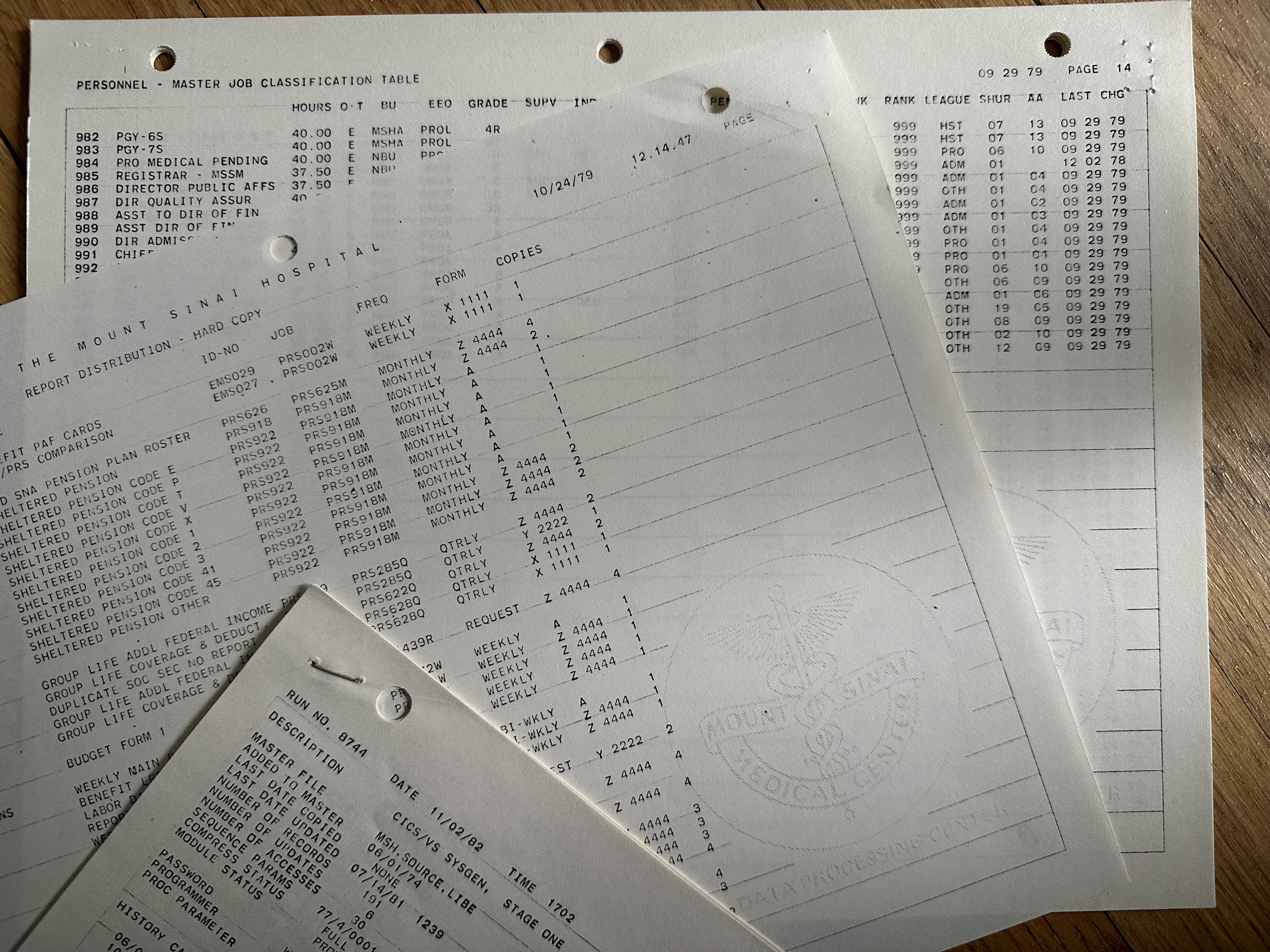
Some printouts from a Xerox 1200, on three-hole-punch plain 8.5 × 11 in paper, showing spacing lines and an organizational logo as the forms projection used

The printer itself has the following characteristics:

- Able to print on ordinary plain paper at up to 4,000 lines per minute, or around 60 sheets per minute. Because of its speed and the fact that it uses cut sheet, this avoided the need to use carbon paper and/or decollation. It is twice as fast as the IBM 3211 which was IBMs fastest line printer at that time.
- Has one 2000-page input hopper.
- Has two 1200-page output stacker bins.
- Exposes one line at a time onto the selenium drum using an optical character generator drum, that has 132 print columns, where each column has a full character set. A set of 22 flash lamps inside the drum flash, exposing the characters onto the selenium drum as the generator drum rotates, one line being printed for each rotation of the character generator drum.
- Offers a 95 character ASCII font as a standard feature.
- It offers a 'forms projection' system that eliminates the need to use pre-printed stationery. An operator installs the desired overlay and it uses the copier platen and optics to project the image onto the selenium drum. Transamerica Insurance Company as an example reported that in February 1975 they were using 600 different pre-printed forms. They used the Xerox 1200 forms overlay feature to remove the need for at least 25 of these.
- It is a discharged area development printer, meaning that the areas of the photoconductor that are initially given a static charge are attractive to toner and the areas of the photoconductor that are discharged by a light source are not developed (they remain white on the page).

When used together with an IBM mainframe running OS/VS1 or MVS, the SYSOUT parameter of JCL could be used to designate both a class of output and the forms to be used in printing. Typically, SYSOUT=X was used as the class for Xerox print output. Thus, for instance, a site might specify SYSOUT='(X,,1111)' in its JCL, where class X output went to the Xerox 1200 and 1111 was the name given to the form indicating a particular custom background for the pages.

== Marketing and use ==
Lease costs for a Xerox 1200 started at $2,100 per month.

Some example early users included the following:

- Selling Areas Marketing Incorporated (Sami) were reported to be one of the first customers to be shipped a Xerox 1200. They ordered five to replace seven Xerox 2400 Impact Printers in July 1974. Implementation began in August 1974. Various mechanical issues slowed down implementation but by September 1975 they had six in operation working reliably.
- Crocker Bank and Trust reported they were using a Xerox 1200 in July 1974 and were so pleased with its speed that they were considering purchasing a second one.
- The CIA took delivery of a Xerox 1200 on September 19, 1974, but installation took six days rather than the expected two and mechanical issues meant it did not go into service until October 10, 1974. Once it entered production they recommended other departments also purchase one. They saw a significant saving in paper costs. In May 1975 they reported they were printing 1.2 million copies per year and saving $3500 per quarter over traditional line-printer costs.

In March 1976 Xerox announced they would also begin offering the Xerox 1200 for sale (rather than the lease-only model they were using), with a list price of US$145,000. That price dropped to $125,000 in December 1976.

== Competitors ==
While the Xerox 1200 was first to market in the non-impact space, it was rapidly joined by the Honeywell Page Printing System in 1974 (with shipments starting in 1975) and the IBM 3800 in 1975 (with shipments starting in 1976).

== Follow on product ==
As the successor to the Xerox 1200, the Xerox 9700 was announced in July 1977 with planned availability in the third quarter of 1978, although with a considerably higher purchase price of $295,000. It was a genuine laser printer that could print 120 pages per minute at 300 dots per inch. It could also print in duplex.
