= Guido Borelli =

Italian painter

Guido Borelli da Caluso is an Italian painter.

== Biography ==
He was born in Caluso in 1952.

He comes from an artistic background, and his family always encouraged him to develop his talent, as early as childhood. He won a contest at 13 and held his first exhibition at the age of 17 at Ars Plauda Gallery in Turin. After high school, he received his artistic training at the Accademia Albertina in Turin. Today, he has permanent exhibitions in art galleries, in Italy, France, the United Kingdom and in the U.S.

== Permanent exhibitions ==
- Gallery 1000, Carmel, CA
- Marlin Art - Deer Park, NY- United States
- Galerie d'Art -Art Passion-, Saint Paul de Vence - France
- Paul Robinson Gallery -Marietta-GA- United States
- French Art Network, New Orleans - United States
- StewArt Gallery, Battle - UK
- Fine Art America
- Galleria Esposti-Milano-Italy
