= Honeywell Level 6 =

Minicomputer models

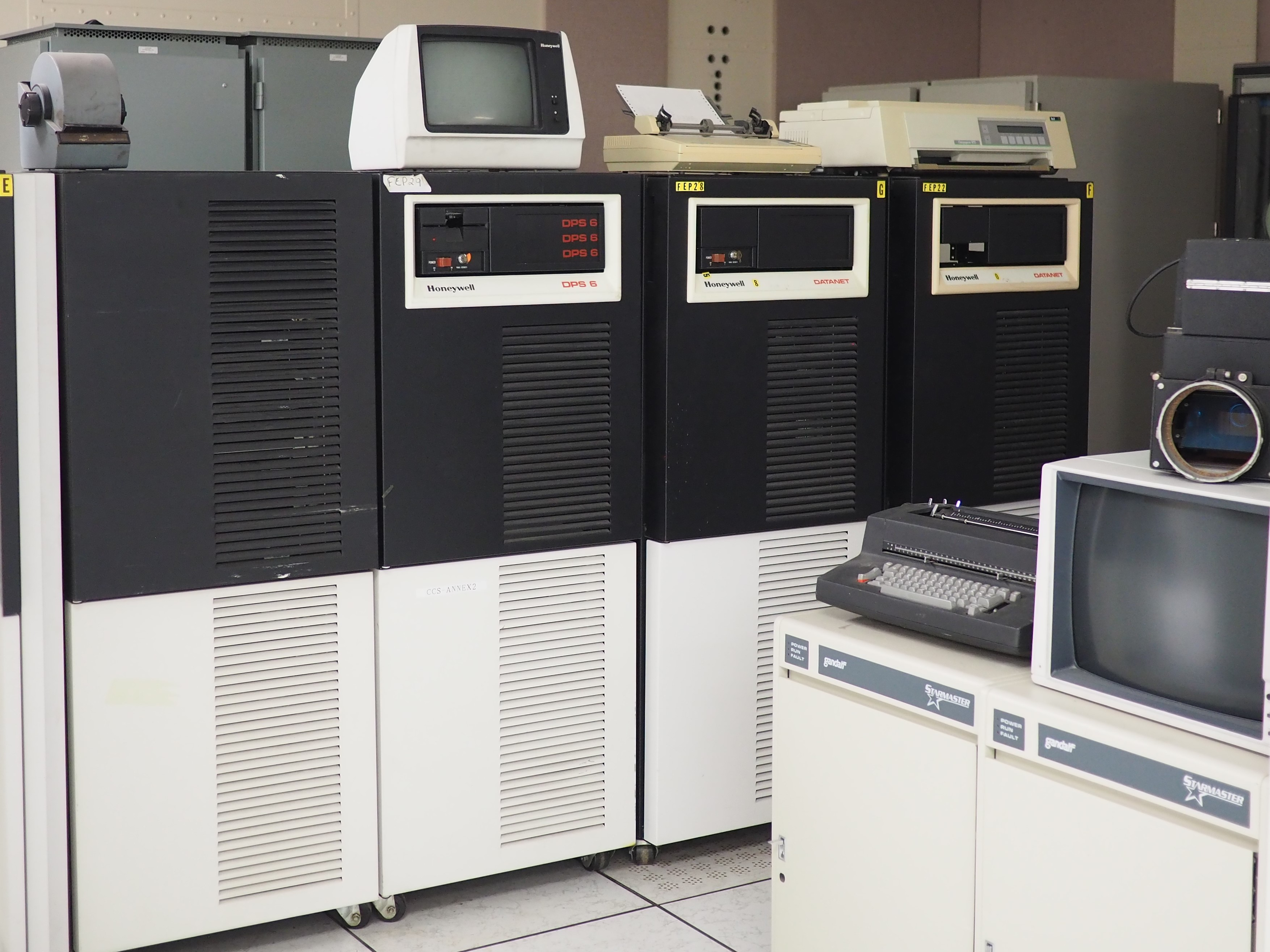
- Honeywell DPS 6 and DATANET minicomputers in the OSAX room of the Diefenbunker at CFS Carp, Ontario, Canada.
- Manufacturer: Honeywell, Inc.

The Honeywell Level 6 was a line of 16-bit minicomputers, later upgraded to 32-bit, manufactured by Honeywell, Inc. from the mid 1970s. Honeywell literature for Models 6/06, 6/34 and 6/36 say "Series 60 (Level 6)". In 1979, the Level 6 was renamed the DPS 6, subsequently DPS 6 Plus and finally DPS 6000.

== Description ==
As initially introduced, the Level 6 consisted of three models: the 6/06, the 6/34, and the 6/36. The CPU featured a real-time clock, a ROM bootstrap loader and 64 interrupt levels. The architecture provided a variety of addressing modes and 18 programmer-visible registers. Rack-mount and tabletop versions were available.

These systems supported up to 64 K words (KW) of MOS memory with a cycle time of 650 nanoseconds.

All three models all featured the Megabus, which was a proprietary asynchronous bus architecture.

By 1978, the line had been extended downwards with the introduction of the 6/23 and 6/33, and upwards with the 6/43, 6/47, 6/53, and 6/57. The 6/23 did not support the Megabus. The 6/33 was the new entry-level upgradable model. The other four models supported up to 1 MW (Mega Words) of memory and 26 registers. A memory management unit (MMU), optional on the 6/43 and 6/47, and standard on the 6/53 and 6/57, supported memory segmentation and four protection rings. An optional Scientific Instruction Processor (SIP) added single- and double-precision hardware floating-point instructions. The 6/47 and 6/57 were enhanced versions of the 6/43 and 6/53 respectively which added a Commercial Instruction Processor (CIP) including 30 additional instructions for character-string manipulation and decimal arithmetic. Among the final developments in the line were the high-end 32-bit 6/95-1, 6/98-1 and dual processor 6/95-2 and 6/98-2 models.

In the 1980s, Honeywell's Datanet 8 line of communications processors, often used as front-end processors for DPS 8 mainframes, shared many hardware components with DPS 6. Another specialised derivative of the Level 6 was the Honeywell Page Printing System.

In June 1986, following Honeywell Information Systems' merger with Bull, Honeywell Bull introduced the DPS 6 Plus line of symmetric multiprocessing 32-bit systems, models 410 and 420 (code named MRX - Medium Range eXtended) with up to four processors. In 1987 they introduced the uniprocessor models 210 and 220 (code named LRX - Low Range eXtended), announced the HRX (High Range eXtended), and Computerworld reported that there were more than 50,000 DPS 6 systems installed worldwide. The HRX was introduced as the DPS 6000 600 series. Recognising the commercial success of Unix, in 1988 Honeywell Bull introduced an 80386-based Unix co-processor for the DPS 6 Plus 400 series.

== Software ==
The operating system for the Level 6 was GCOS 6:

- GCOS 6 Mod 200 was an entry version of the system oriented toward interactive data entry.
- GCOS 6 Mod 400 was a batch operating system also used to run process-control applications.
- GCOS 6 Mod 600 was a time-sharing operating system.
- The DPS 6 Plus line ran HVS 6 Plus.
- The Pick operating system was a multi-user, time sharing business operating system for the Level 6 platform.

== See also ==
- General Comprehensive Operating System
