= Gary Starkweather =

American inventor and engineer (1938–2019)

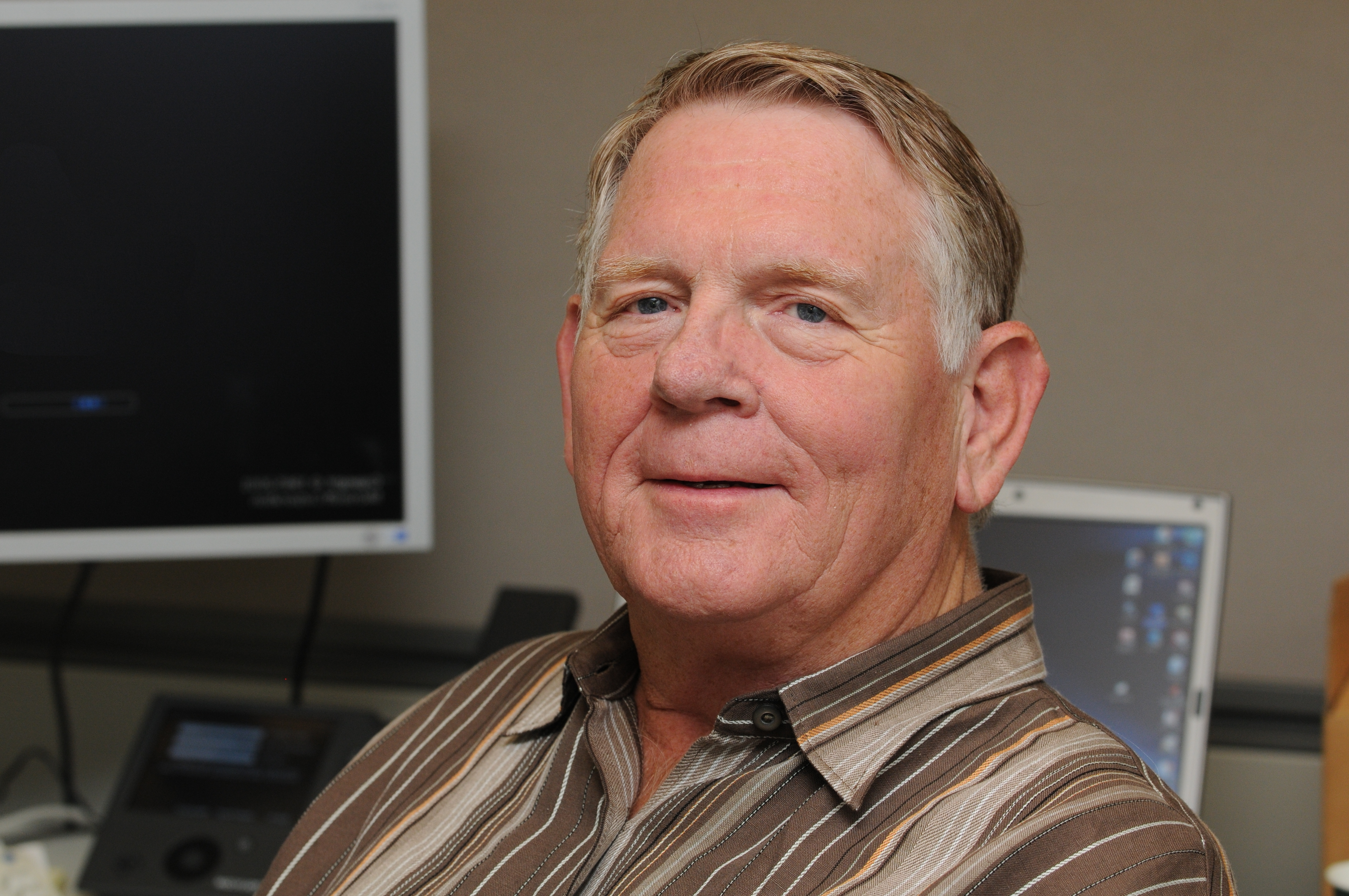
- Gary Starkweather in his office at Microsoft Research in 2009
- Born: January 9, 1938; Lansing, Michigan, U.S.
- Died: December 26, 2019 (aged 81); Orlando, Florida, U.S.
- Engineering career
- Discipline: Engineering
- Institutions: Xerox Webster Research Center
- Practice name: Xerox PARC
- Employers: Xerox, Apple Computer, Lucasfilm, Pixar, Microsoft
- Projects: Invention of the laser printer and color management
- Awards: David Richardson Medal

Gary Keith Starkweather (January 9, 1938 – December 26, 2019) was an American engineer who invented the laser printer and color management.

Starkweather received a B.S. in physics from Michigan State University in 1960 and an M.S. in optics from the University of Rochester in 1966. In 1969, Starkweather invented the laser printer at the Xerox Webster Research Center. He collaborated on the first fully functional laser-printing system at Xerox PARC in 1971.

At Apple Computer in the 1990s, Starkweather invented color management technology and led the development of Colorsync 1.0. In 1991, he was awarded the David Richardson Medal. Starkweather joined Microsoft Research in 1997, where he worked on display technology.

Starkweather also made major contributions to digital matte film techniques. He was a consultant on the digital effects team for Star Wars (1977). He won a technical Academy Award in 1994 for his pioneering work with Lucasfilm (and later, Pixar) in the field of color film scanning.

In 2004, he was elected to the United States National Academy of Engineering. He retired in 2005. Starkweather died on December 26, 2019, at the age of 81.
