= Trustco Bank =

Commercial bank within the United States

- Type: Subsidiary
- Industry: Banking
- Founded: 1902; 124 years ago
- Headquarters: Glenville, New York, U.S.
- Number of locations: 146 branches
- Area served: Florida, Massachusetts, New York, New Jersey, and Vermont
- Products: Financial services
- Total assets: US$6.2 billion (2024)
- Number of employees: 737 (2024)
- Parent: Trustco Bank Corp NY
- Website: trustcobank.com

Trustco Bank is the sole subsidiary of Trustco Bank Corp NY, an American bank holding company based in Glenville, New York. Founded in 1902 in Schenectady, the bank now operates 146 branches across New York, Florida, Massachusetts, New Jersey, and Vermont.

== Services ==
The bank provides general commercial banking services to individuals, partnerships, corporations and governments of New York, Florida, Massachusetts, New Jersey and Vermont. The Group provides commercial, construction, residential mortgage, home equity lines of credit and installment loans. It also accepts demand, savings, checking accounts, money market accounts and certificates of deposit from customers. Its commercial lending activities are focused on balancing the Company's commitment to meeting the credit needs of businesses in its market area with the necessity of managing its credit risk. Trustco Bank is a portfolio lender, which means it does not sell or trade any loans. Trustco Bank offers first and second mortgages, and has a full service commercial lending department. Recently, Trustco has added an electronic version of the monthly statement with images available online and free online banking via their internet site.

Recently added to their list of services are interest-bearing checking and free business checking, each having their own set of perks such as free checks and no minimum balances.

During 2007, 16 new branches were added. The Group operates 108 automatic teller machines and 107 banking offices in Albany, Columbia, Dutchess, Greene, Montgomery, Rensselaer, Rockland, Saratoga, Schenectady, Schoharie, Ulster, Warren, Washington and Westchester.

In 2002, Trustco Bank branched out to central Florida, the first Florida branch having opened its doors in 2003 to customers in the Orlando area. They now have 51 branches in Florida in Brevard, Hillsborough, Lake, Manatee, Orange, Osceola, Polk, Sarasota, Seminole and Volusia counties.

== History ==
=== Purchase of Schenectady Bank and General Electric ===
On February 17, 1902, the first trust company was chartered in Schenectady, formed through the purchase of the assets of the Schenectady Bank (c. 1832). As the credit union for General Electric Corporation, Schenectady Trust Company opened for business on June 9, 1902, with 11 employees, and initial deposits of $762,578.11. The original buildings resided at 320 and 318 State Street in downtown Schenectady, New York. Charles P. Steinmetz (the “Electrical Wizard”) of General Electric and Union College fame was a major depositor and Samuel M. Hamill of General Electric became the first President of the Schenectady Trust Company. Total deposits at the end of the bank's first year were over $1.5 million.

=== Schenectady Trust Company ===
By 1912, business in Schenectady, especially General Electric, was booming. As many new businesses emerged at a rapid rate, many of them received their earliest financing from Schenectady Trust Company. In 1919 Schenectady Trust Company built the structure that is now known as the Main Trustco Bank branch office at 320 State Street. Gerardus Smith was president of the bank at the close of 1912, and total assets were $4.5 million.

=== The Roaring Twenties ===
The Mont Pleasant branch office opened in 1924. In 1925, Proctor's Theatre, Erie Boulevard and the Western Gateway Bridge opened more culture, tourism and commerce to Schenectady. The third branch, the Brandywine office, was opened in 1928. In the late twenties Schenectady's building boom took place and Schenectady Trust provided mortgage loans. At the close of 1922, H.B. Boardman was President of the Bank, and total assets were $12.1 million.

=== The Depression and World War II ===
Even though the thirties saw the economy come to a virtual standstill, Schenectady Trust continued to pay out dividends to shareholders, making a consistent record of paying dividends since 1904. At the end of 1932, H.B. Boardman was still President of the Bank, and total assets were $16.7 million. The forties threw the nation into World War II, Schenectady Trust put plans in motion to provide direct auto financing for the increasing mobile population. By 1946, the Union Street Branch was open. At the end of 1942, Edward T. Rice was Chairman of the Board and Laurence G. Magner was President of the Bank; total assets were $34.9 million. In 1947, Schenectady Trust acquired Union National Bank, which opened in 1891. Modernization of the Main Branch and State Street Branch began.

=== Post War Era ===
In response to the 1954 opening of the New York State Thruway, Schenectady Trust expanded with branches into the suburbs to accommodate the growing population. By 1956, the Mayfair Branch office in Glenville and the Sheridan Plaza Branch office were opened. The Union Street Branch office was moved into its present location during the fifties. Ralph H. Rue was President of the bank at the end of 1952 and total assets were $74.2 million.

=== 1960s ===
Though the local Schenectady economy began the decade with a slowdown, employment ended on an upswing at Schenectady Trust as they continued to grow with the community. Four more Branch offices were opened during the time: Rotterdam in 1965, the Trust Division in March 1968 and in June, 1968 Clifton Park and Plaza Seven were opened. In 1965, the financial computer center of Eastern New York was organized as a joint electronic data processing center by Schenectady Trust and eight other area banks. At the end of 1962, Ralph H. Rue was still President of the Bank, and total assets were $100.2 million.

=== 1970s ===
In spite of inflation, the seventies showed growth in the Schenectady area—that growth was reflected in the Bank's services and prompted additional Branch office openings. New services were introduced during this period: Personal Line of Credit, Statement Savings and Bank Americard (now VISA). Along with the new services, new Branches were opened in Niskayuna, Colonie and Guilderland. In 1973 the Main Branch interior was again enlarged and renovated, and the lot at the rear of the bank (former location of Redmond gas station) was purchased for parking and allowed access to Erie Boulevard. Toward the very end of the seventies, additional properties on Erie Boulevard were purchased that would later become the Trust Operations Building. At the end of 1972, H. Gladstone McKeon was President of the Bank and total assets were $151 million.

=== 1980s and Formation of TrustCo Bank Corp NY ===
The bank continued to expand in the 1980s as they extended to the entire Capital Region. In July 1982, TrustCo Bank Corp NY was formed and a new Operations Center opened on Erie Boulevard in 1982 to handle the acquisition of seven Bank of New York offices, which occurred in January 1984. Schenectady Trust Company was renamed Trustco Bank New York in January 1989.

By the end of 1982, Harry E. Whittingham, Jr. was chairman and chief executive officer, and Robert A. McCormick was president and chief operation officer of the bank. Total assets were $301.4 million, net income was $2.9 million and market capitalization was $17 million.

=== Acquisition of Home & City Savings Bank ===
Trustco acquired Home & City Savings Bank and a three-story expansion of the Erie Boulevard Trust Operations Building in 1991. In May 1992, Trustco Bank sponsored and hosted a block party on Erie Boulevard to celebrate the 90th Anniversary of the Bank and its $2.1 billion in assets by the end of 1995. The nineties also saw new Branch openings in Glens Falls, Queensbury, Wilton Mall and Clifton Park—which along with the former Home & City offices brought the total Branch locations to 53 throughout the Capital Region by the end of the decade. At the end of 1992, Robert A. McCormick was president and chief executive officer of the Bank, total assets were $1.9 billion, net income was $17.5 million and market capitalization was $222 million.

=== 2000s ===
In July 2000 Trustco acquired a Savings Bank Charter and subsequently acquired Landmark Financial Corp. and its subsidiary, Landmark Community Bank, which was completed on July 28, 2000. Further expansion was made possible by an accompanying federal thrift charter. The Trustco Bank corporate headquarters relocated to Trustco Center in Glenville during 2001. The total number of Branch offices tops out at 60, with plans to expand downstate and into Florida. As of December 31, 2001 total assets were $2.6 billion, net income was $45.5 million and market capitalization was $896 million. Robert A. McCormick, chairman, president and chief executive officer, celebrated 25 years with the Bank in January 2002, 17 of those as CEO. Despite a poor economy and bank bailouts, Trustco expanded into Downstate New York as well as into Florida between 2002 and 2009 (36 in Central Florida and five in other areas of the state). Two Branch openings occurred in the first quarter of 2010 in Sun City Center and Lady Lake, Florida. By March 2010, Trustco Bank had 134 branch locations in five states (New York, New Jersey, Massachusetts, Vermont and Florida).

== Community involvements ==
As Trustco opens additional branches in new markets, they host grand opening events, as well as become a “Home Town Bank” by participating in and sponsoring local and community-centric events. Trustco Bank is a sponsor of the annual celebration, Red, Hot & Boom, a July Fourth celebration at Crane's Roost Park in the Uptown Altamonte area of Altamonte Springs, Florida. Florida Collegiate Summer League, a wood bat baseball league with five teams in Central Florida, is a recipient of a seasonal Trustco Bank sponsorship. Further, Holiday in the Park at Lake Eola in Downtown Orlando is an annual sponsorship event that Trustco participated in December 2008 and 2009. In New York, Trustco has sponsored the Clifton Park Fourth of July Parade that runs all the way from the Shenendehowa High School campus to Clifton Common. Giving back to their Schenectady roots, Truscto Bank also sponsors the Tri-City ValleyCats, a minor league baseball team named after the Tri-Cities – Troy, Albany and Schenectady – that make up New York state's Capital District.

== Green initiatives ==
Trustco has incorporated green initiatives into its service offerings with online banking capabilities, as well as the marketing and promotions materials. In the spring of 2009, Trustco Bank sent out postcards on actual “seed paper,” encouraging deposits from new customers as well as put the wild-flower-growing mailer in the ground. Additionally, Trustco Bank created promotions centered on several local supermarkets and offered recyclable/reusable shopping totes and $50 gift cards, to keep the money and other natural resources, in the local community.

== Awards and accolades ==
Trustco Bank was named a Bauer Financial recommended bank. Bank Director magazine named TrustCo Bank Corp NY (TrustCo, Nasdaq: TRST) as one of America's top banks. In its 1st Quarter 2009 edition the magazine named Trustco number 21 of the top 150 performers in the banking industry. TrustCo ranked 21st for the 2008 calendar year based on an objective analysis of profitability, capital strength and asset quality. Trustco has been nationally ranked three years in a row by highly respected financial reporting agencies.

- Bank Director magazine ranks Trustco Bank as one of the top 30 Banks in the country.
- ABA Banking Journal names Trustco Bank 8th nationally.
- SNL Thrift Investor (a publication by SNL Financial) ranks Trustco Bank top ten in the country.
- Trustco Bank received Audit Integrity Award – placed top 1% of 8,000 publicly traded companies.
- Trustco Bank named 4th best bank in the country by U.S. Banker magazine.
