= SYSIN =

SYSIN most commonly refers to:

- System input in OS/360 and successors
  - OS/360 and successors § System job queue, SYSIN and SYSOUT
  - Job Entry Subsystem 1 § SYSIN
  - OS/VS2 (SVS) § System job queue, SYSIN and SYSOUT
  - MVS Job Entry Subsystems § SYSIN
  - Houston Automatic Spooling Priority § SYSIN
  - Attached Support Processor § SYSIN
- System input in DOS/360 and successors
  - GRASP (spooler) § SYSIN and SYSOUT

== See also ==
- SYSOUT (disambiguation)
