= SYSOUT =

SYSOUT most commonly refers to:

- System output in OS/360 and successors
  - OS/360 and successors § System job queue, SYSIN and SYSOUT
  - Job Entry Subsystem 1 § SYSOUT
  - OS/VS2 (SVS) § System job queue, SYSIN and SYSOUT
  - MVS Job Entry Subsystems § SYSOUT
  - Houston Automatic Spooling Priority § SYSOUT
  - Attached Support Processor § SYSOUT
- System output in DOS/360 and successors
  - GRASP (spooler) § SYSIN and SYSOUT

== See also ==
- SYSIN (disambiguation)
