= RJP =

RJP may refer to

- Rashtriya Janahita Party, political party in India
- Rastriya Janashakti Party, political party in Nepal
- Realistic job preview
- Polish Language Council, Rada Języka Polskiego
- Remote Job Processing, IBM Remote job entry in ASP and JES3
- Raquel Jaramillo Palacio, the author of the bestselling novel Wonder
