= System =

Interrelated entities that form a whole

Systems can be isolated, closed, or open.

A system is a group of interacting or interrelated elements that act according to a set of rules or set of constraints to form a unified whole. A system, surrounded and influenced by its environment, is described by its boundaries, structure and purpose and is expressed in its functioning. Systems are the subjects of study of systems theory and other systems sciences.

Systems have several common properties and characteristics, including structure, function(s), behavior and interconnectivity.

== Etymology ==
The term system comes from the Latin word systēma, in turn from Greek σύστημα systēma: "whole concept made of several parts or members, system"; or, in a literary sense, "composition".

== History ==
In the 19th century, the French physicist Nicolas Léonard Sadi Carnot, who studied thermodynamics, pioneered the development of the concept of a system in the natural sciences. In 1824, he studied the system which he called the working substance (typically a body of water vapor) in steam engines, in regard to the system's ability to do work when heat is applied to it. The working substance could be put in contact with either a boiler, a cold reservoir (a stream of cold water), or a piston (on which the working body could do work by pushing on it). In 1850, the German physicist Rudolf Clausius generalized this picture to include the concept of the surroundings and began to use the term working body when referring to the system.

The biologist Ludwig von Bertalanffy became one of the pioneers of the general systems theory. In 1945, he introduced models, principles, and laws that apply to generalized systems or their subclasses, irrespective of their particular kind, the nature of their component elements, and the relation or 'forces' between them.

In the late 1940s and mid-50s, Norbert Wiener and Ross Ashby pioneered the use of mathematics to study systems of control and communication, calling it cybernetics.

In the 1960s, Marshall McLuhan applied general systems theory in an approach that he called a field approach and figure/ground analysis, to the study of media theory.

In 1968, Walter F. Buckley coined the term complex adaptive system.

== Concepts ==
The semantic content of the concept "System": Process • Property • Factor • Profile • Balance • Transaction.

=== Environment and boundaries ===
Systems theory views the world as a complex system of interconnected parts. One scopes a system by defining its boundary; this means choosing which entities are inside the system and which are outside—part of the environment. One can make simplified representations (models) of the system in order to understand it and to predict or impact its future behavior. These models may define the structure and behavior of the system.

=== Natural and human-made systems ===
There are natural and human-made (designed) systems. Natural systems may not have an apparent objective but their behavior can be interpreted as purposeful by an observer. Human-made systems are made with various purposes that are achieved by some action performed by or with the system. The parts of a system must be related; they must be "designed to work as a coherent entity"—otherwise they would be two or more distinct systems.

Open systems have input and output flows, representing exchanges of matter, energy or information with their surroundings.

=== Theoretical framework ===
Most systems are open systems, exchanging matter and energy with their respective surroundings; like a car, a coffeemaker, or Earth. A closed system exchanges energy, but not matter, with its environment, like a computer or the project Biosphere 2. An isolated system exchanges neither matter nor energy with its environment. A theoretical example of such a system is the Universe.

=== Process and transformation process ===
An open system can also be viewed as a bounded transformation process, that is, a black box that is a process or collection of processes that transform inputs into outputs. Inputs are consumed; outputs are produced. The concept of input and output here is very broad. For example, an output of a passenger ship is the movement of people from departure to destination.

=== System model ===
A system comprises multiple views. Human-made systems may have such views as concept, analysis, design, implementation, deployment, structure, behavior, input data, and output data views. A system model is required to describe and represent all these views.

=== Systems architecture ===
A systems architecture, using a single integrated model for the description of multiple views, is a kind of system model.

=== Subsystem ===
A subsystem is a set of elements that is a system itself, and a component of a larger system. The IBM Mainframe Job Entry Subsystem family (JES1, JES2, JES3, and their HASP/ASP predecessors) are examples. The main elements they have in common are the components that handle input, scheduling, spooling and output; they also have the ability to interact with local and remote operators.

A subsystem description is a system object that contains information defining the characteristics of an operating environment controlled by the system. The data tests are performed to verify the correctness of the individual subsystem configuration data (e.g. MA Length, Static Speed Profile, …) and they are related to a single subsystem in order to test its Specific Application (SA).

== Analysis ==
There are many kinds of systems that can be analyzed both quantitatively and qualitatively. For example, in an analysis of urban system dynamics, A . W. Steiss defined five intersecting systems, including the physical subsystem and behavioral system. For sociological models influenced by systems theory, Kenneth D. Bailey defined systems in terms of conceptual, concrete, and abstract systems, either isolated, closed, or open. Walter F. Buckley defined systems in sociology in terms of mechanical, organic, and process models. Bela H. Banathy cautioned that for any inquiry into a system, understanding its kind is crucial, and defined natural and designed (artificial) systems. For example, natural systems include subatomic systems, living systems, the Solar System, galaxies, and the Universe, while artificial systems include man-made physical structures, hybrids of natural and artificial systems, and conceptual knowledge. The human elements of organization and functions are emphasized with their relevant abstract systems and representations.

George J. Klir maintained that no "classification is complete and perfect for all purposes", and defined systems as abstract, real, and conceptual physical systems, bounded and unbounded systems, discrete to continuous, pulse to hybrid systems, etc. The interactions between systems and their environments are categorized as relatively closed and open systems. Important distinctions have also been made between hard systems—–technical in nature and amenable to methods such as systems engineering, operations research, and quantitative systems analysis—and soft systems that involve people and organizations, commonly associated with concepts developed by Peter Checkland and Brian Wilson through soft systems methodology (SSM) involving methods such as action research and an emphasis on participatory designs. Where hard systems might be identified as more scientific, the distinction between them is often elusive.

=== Economic system ===
An economic system is a social institution which deals with the production, distribution and consumption of goods and services in a particular society. The economic system is composed of people, institutions and their relationships to resources, such as the convention of property. It addresses the problems of economics, like the allocation and scarcity of resources.

The international sphere of interacting states is described and analyzed in systems terms by several international relations scholars, most notably in the neorealist school. This systems mode of international analysis has, however, been challenged by other schools of international relations thought, most notably the constructivist school, which argues that an over-large focus on systems and structures can obscure the role of individual agency in social interactions. Systems-based models of international relations also underlie the vision of the international sphere held by the liberal institutionalist school of thought, which places more emphasis on systems generated by rules and interaction governance, particularly economic governance.

=== Information and computer science ===
In computer science and information science, an information system is a hardware system, software system, or combination, which has components as its structure and observable inter-process communications as its behavior.

There are systems of counting, as with Roman numerals, and various systems for filing papers, or catalogs, and various library systems, of which the Dewey Decimal Classification is an example. This still fits with the definition of components that are connected together (in this case, to facilitate the flow of information).

System can also refer to a framework, aka platform, be it software or hardware, designed to allow software programs to run. A flaw in a component or system can cause the component itself or an entire system to fail to perform its required function, e.g., an incorrect statement or data definition.

=== Engineering and physics ===
In engineering and physics, a physical system is the portion of the universe that is being studied (of which a thermodynamic system is one major example). Engineering also has the concept of a system referring to all of the parts and interactions between parts of a complex project. Systems engineering is the branch of engineering that studies how this type of system should be planned, designed, implemented, built, and maintained.

=== Sociology, cognitive science and management research ===
Social and cognitive sciences recognize systems in models of individual humans and in human societies. They include human brain functions and mental processes as well as normative ethics systems and social and cultural behavioral patterns.

In management science, operations research and organizational development, human organizations are viewed as management systems of interacting components such as subsystems or system aggregates, which are carriers of numerous complex business processes (organizational behaviors) and organizational structures. Organizational development theorist Peter Senge developed the notion of organizations as systems in his book The Fifth Discipline.

Organizational theorists such as Margaret Wheatley have also described the workings of organizational systems in new metaphoric contexts, such as quantum physics, chaos theory, and the self-organization of systems.

=== Pure logic ===
There is also such a thing as a logical system. An obvious example is the calculus developed simultaneously by Leibniz and Isaac Newton. Another example is George Boole's Boolean operators. Other examples relate specifically to philosophy, biology, or cognitive science. Maslow's hierarchy of needs applies psychology to biology by using pure logic. Numerous psychologists, including Carl Jung and Sigmund Freud developed systems that logically organize psychological domains, such as personalities, motivations, or intellect and desire.

=== Strategic thinking ===
In 1988, military strategist John A. Warden III introduced the Five Ring System model in his book, The Air Campaign, contending that any complex system could be broken down into five concentric rings. Each ring—leadership, processes, infrastructure, population and action units—could be used to isolate key elements of any system that needed change. The model was used effectively by Air Force planners in the Iran–Iraq War. In the late 1990s, Warden applied his model to business strategy.

== See also ==
- Complexity
  - Complexity theory and organizations
- Formal system
- Glossary of systems theory
- Human body § Systems, systems in the human body
- Market (economics)
- Meta-system
- System of systems
- System of systems engineering
- Systems art

== Bibliography ==
- Alexander Backlund (2000). "The definition of system". In: Kybernetes Vol. 29 nr. 4, pp. 444–451.
- Kenneth D. Bailey (1994). Sociology and the New Systems Theory: Toward a Theoretical Synthesis. New York: State of New York Press.
- Bela H. Banathy (1997). A Taste of Systemics at the Wayback Machine (archived 2023-03-07), ISSS The Primer Project.
- Walter F. Buckley (1967). Sociology and Modern Systems Theory, New Jersey: Englewood Cliffs.
- Peter Checkland (1997). Systems Thinking, Systems Practice. Chichester: John Wiley & Sons, Ltd.
- Michel Crozier, Erhard Friedberg (1981). Actors and Systems, Chicago University Press.
- Robert L. Flood (1999). Rethinking the Fifth Discipline: Learning within the unknowable at the Wayback Machine (archived 2019-02-25). London: Routledge.
- George J. Klir (1969). Approach to General Systems Theory, 1969.
- Rubanov, Vladimir (2022). I see the meaning. The Semantic Topology Knowledge Base. Atlas of Conceptual Models of Universal Meanings [Вижу смысл. База знаний «Семантическая топология». Атлас концептуальных моделей универсальных смыслов] (in Russian). Argo Books. ISBN 978-5-517-09043-0. Archived (PDF) from the original on 2023-10-25.
- Brian Wilson (1980). Systems: Concepts, methodologies and Applications, John Wiley.
- Brian Wilson (2001). Soft Systems Methodology—Conceptual model building and its contribution, J.H.Wiley.
- Beynon-Davies, P. (2009). Business Information + Systems. Palgrave, Basingstoke. ISBN 978-0-230-20368-6.
