= Remote job entry =

Procedure for sending requests to mainframe computers

Remote job entry, or Remote Batch, is the procedure for sending requests for non-interactive data processing tasks (jobs) to mainframe computers from remote workstations, and by extension the process of receiving the output from such jobs at a remote workstation.

The RJE workstation is called a remote because it usually is located some distance from the host computer. The workstation connects to the host through a modem, digital link, packet-switching network (Note: E.g., Internet, X.25) or local area network (LAN). RJE is similar to uux and SSH, except that the workstation sends a complete job stream (Note: One or more STDIN streams in Unix terminology) rather than a single command and that the user typically (Note: In MVS, IBM introduced the concept of spinning a SYSOUT data set, i.e., releasing it for processing prior to the end of execution.) does not receive any output until the completion of the job. The terms Remote Batch, Remote Job System and Remote Job Processing are also used for RJE facilities.

== Examples ==
Remote Job Entry (RJE) is also the name of an OS/360 component that provided RJE services. An RJE workstation operator may have complete console control of the job flow between the workstation and mainframe, depending on local configuration and policy.

Houston Automatic Spooling Priority (HASP) initially supported job entry from terminals using Synchronous transmit-receive (STR); eventually HASP II supported only Binary Synchronous Communications (BSC), and added the Multi-leaving protocol for BSC programmable work stations; this protocol is incompatible with that used by OS/360 RJE and is the basis for protocols used for job submission from programmable work stations for, e.g., Attached Support Processor (ASP), JES2, JES3, OS/VS1 Remote Entry Services (RES), VM RSCS, as well as the later protocols for Network Job Entry (NJE) in, e.g., JES2, JES3, VM RSCS.

Conversational Remote Job Entry (CRJE) is a component of OS/360 and OS/VS1 that provides job submission, job retrieval and editing for a user at an interactive terminal.

Remote Entry Services] (RES) is a component of OS/VS1 that provides RJE services. An RES workstation operator may have complete console control of the job flow between the workstation and mainframe, depending on local configuration and policy.

Remote Spooling Communications Subsystem (RSCS) is, depending on the release, a component of or extra cost product in VM that provides RJE services. The RSCS in the free VM/370 only supported BSC; (Note: including multi-leaving) IBM added support for Systems Network Architecture (SNA), NJE and TCP/IP over several chargeable versions.

Network Job Entry (NJE) is Store and forward networking for transmitting, e.g., card files, jobs, printed output, among peers. The initial versions of NJE for JES2, JES3, VSE POWER and VM RSCS used BSC multileaving, but IBM quickly added support for Channel-to-channel adapters. IBM later added support for SNA and, ultimately, TCP/IP.

NETRJS is the protocol developed by the Campus Computing Network at UCLA to deliver batch jobs to the Remote Job Service (RJS) on their IBM 360 Model 91. This protocol was originally assigned to ARPANET Initial Connection Protocol sockets 71, 73, and 75, and later reassigned to Internet ports 71–74. RJS is a subsystem of OS/360 MVS written by UCLA to support remote batch from card-reader/printer terminals.

== RJE workstations ==
Early RJE workstations, sometimes known as remote batch terminals, were "dumb" (non-programmable) devices using byte-synchronous communications protocols such as IBM BISYNC or STR, or equivalents from other vendors. Later, programmable devices or small computers were used, and IBM developed a protocol called HASP multileaving for use with HASP, and later, e.g., ASP, JES2, JES3, RSCS. The IBM System/360 Model 20 and 1130, the Mohawk Data MDS 2400 and the UNIVAC 1004, were popular. Later still RJE workstations switched to bit-oriented full duplex protocols such as IBM Synchronous Data Link Control, HDLC, or X.25. The Internet Engineering Task Force has defined RFCs for internet remote job entry protocols, but they are now considered obsolete or legacy.

The 200 USER Terminal is a remote batch terminal and protocol developed by the Control Data Corporation for their CDC 6000 series and CDC 3000 series mainframe computers in the 1960s. A 200 USER Terminal consisted of a low speed punched card reader, a line printer, and a CRT operators console. It typically communicated with a remote mainframe via synchronous modem. The software subsystem on the mainframe side was called Export-Import 200, and later, the Remote Batch Facility (RBF). Other remote batch terminals using the UT200 protocol included the CDC 731, 732, and 734. Software emulators for the UT200 protocol were also written for a number of minicomputer systems.

== Network Job Entry ==
RJE is well suited to organizations that had a single large central computer center. However, in large organizations with multiple data centers, there was an interest in a peer-to-peer transfer of, e.g., submitted jobs, printer output. Following customer requests, IBM developed a suite of facilities, derived from BITNET and VNET, known as Network Job Entry. As part of that software, IBM provided commands to transmit datasets among nodes (complexes of computers with a collective name). NJE allows a batch job to control where it would run and where its output would be processed; similarly, NJE allows an interactive user to send printed or punched output to a different node.

IBM has integrated NJE facilities into its mainframe software, and it is no longer available as separate products. However, the NJE support in JES3 requires the Batch Data Transmission (BDT) program product and the NJE support in z/VM requires the Remote Spooling Communications Subsystem (RSCS) program product. NJE supports Binary Synchronous Communications (BSC), Channel-to-channel adapter (CTCA), Systems Network Architecture (SNA) and TCP/IP connections among its nodes.

== See also ==
- Job control
- Job stream
- Houston Automatic Spooling Priority (HASP)
- Asymmetric Multiprocessing System, 360A-CX-15X, previously known as Attached Support Processor (ASP)
- Remote Spooling Communications Subsystem (RSCS)
