= NJE =

NJE may refer to:

- Network Job Entry (NJE), an IBM protocol
- Nje, a letter of the Cyrillic script
