= System generation =

Historical computer setup process

In computing system generation or sysgen is the process of creating a particular unique instance of an operating system by combining user-specified options and parameters with manufacturer-supplied general-purpose program code to produce an operating system tailored for a particular hardware and software environment. The term is primarily used when referencing older mainframe and minicomputer operating systems.

Some other programs have similar processes, although not usually called "sysgen." For example, IBM's Customer Information Control System (CICS) was installed through a process called CICSGEN.

== Rationale ==
A large general-purpose program such as an operating system has to provide support for all variations of Central processing unit (CPU) that it might be run on, for all supported main memory sizes, and for all possible configurations of input/output (I/O) equipment. No one installation requires all this support, so system generation provides a process for selecting the options and features actually required on any one system.

Sysgen produces a system that is most efficient in terms of CPU time, main memory requirements, I/O activity, and/or disk space. Often these parameters can be traded off, for example to generate a system that requires less memory at the expense of increased disk I/O operations.

== Examples ==
- The Burroughs large systems Master Control Programs (MCP) were written in high-level ALGOL-like languages ESPOL or NEWP. The MCP is tailored by coding $OMIT conditional-compilation pragmas, which conditionally bypass compilation of specified pieces of code.
- IBM System/360 Disk Operating System (DOS) was written in assembler. The systems programmer performing the sysgen codes assembler macros specifying the desired options and assembles the supervisor.
- IBM OS/360 has a two-step procedure called Stage I and Stage II. In Stage I the programmer specified the options for the system in a set of macros and assembled them. The output of Stage I was a job stream which contains the job control to perform all the necessary assemblies, link edits, and to create the required system libraries and copy the necessary modules into them.
- IBM Network Control Program (NCP) and Emulation program (EP) for the IBM 3705 have two-step procedures similar to that of OS/360.
- RSX-11M had a three-phase SYSGEN that was required to add new hardware to the base executive.

== See also ==
- System Generation (OS)
