= OS/VS1 =

IBM operating system

- Developer: IBM
- Written in: Assembler (XF), PL/S (nee BSL)
- Working state: Historic
- Latest release: OS/VS1 Basic Programming Extensions (BPE) Release 4 / March 1984; 42 years ago
- Marketing target: IBM mainframes
- Supported platforms: System/370
- License: Proprietary
- Preceded by: OS/360

Operating System/Virtual Storage 1, or OS/VS1, is a discontinued IBM mainframe computer operating system designed to be run on IBM System/370 hardware. It was the successor to the Multiprogramming with a Fixed number of Tasks (MFT) option of System/360's operating system OS/360. OS/VS1, in comparison to its predecessor, supported virtual memory (then called virtual storage). OS/VS1 was generally available during the 1970s and 1980s, and it is no longer supported by IBM.

== Description ==
OS/VS1 was OS/360 MFT II with a single virtual address space; by comparison, OS/VS2 SVS was OS/360 MVT with a single virtual address space. OS/VS1 was often installed on mid-range IBM mainframe systems, such as the System/370 Model 145 and, later, the System/370 Model 148.

OS/VS1 was intended to manage a medium-sized work load (for the 1970s) consisting only of batch processing applications, running within a fixed number of operating system partitions via the batch job management system Job Entry Subsystem 1 (JES1). This was in contrast to OS/VS2 which was intended to handle larger work loads consisting of batch applications, online interactive users (using the Time Sharing Option, or TSO), or a combination of both. However, OS/VS1 could, and often did, support interactive applications and users by running IBM's CICS transaction processing monitor as a job within one of its partitions.

Installation and modification of OS/VS1 is accomplished via IBM's System Generation (SYSGEN) process.

== Job Entry Subsystem (JES) ==
Job Entry Subsystem (JES, JES1) is a replacement for the spooling facilities of OS/360.

The job entry subsystem (JES) is a significant new feature of VS1. It replaces MFT readers, writers, job queue management, and HASP II. JES provides centralized management of system input data, system output data, and job queue processing. It handles local system input and system output streams, allocates and manages intermediate direct access storage for this data, interfaces with RES to handle remote. input and output streams, and manages allocation and processing of the job queue.

== Remote Entry Services (RES) ==
Remote Entry Services (RES) is a replacement for OS/360 RJE. It allows submission and retrieval of jobs by 2770, 2780 and 3780 terminals and by workstation programs included with OS/VS1 for, e.g., the IBM 1130. RES includes Remote Terminal Access Method and a closer integration with Job Management than what RJE had.

== IBM upgrades ==
OS/VS1 went through seven product releases. IBM enhanced OS/VS1 Release 7 with four releases of the IBM OS/VS1 Basic Programming Extensions (BPE), product 5662-257. BPE provides support for new 1980s hardware, such as 3380 Direct Access Storage, and for VM handshaking between VTAM and VM/VTAM Communications Network Application (VCNA).

IBM announced the last BPE release, OS/VS1 Basic Programming Extensions Release 4, on September 15, 1983, with planned general availability in March 1984.

IBM announced the end of functional enhancements to OS/VS1 in 1984. IBM recommended OS/VS1 installations migrate to MVS/370 or MVS/XA. To assist with the migration to MVS/XA, IBM made the VM/XA Migration Aid. It allowed installations to run OS/VS1 and MVS/XA simultaneously on the same machine, as guests of a third system – VM/XA. This way, the new MVS/XA system could be tested while the old production OS/VS1 system was still in use.

On January 24, 1989, IBM announced the intention to withdraw OS/VS1 and OS/VS1 BPE from marketing effective April 24, 1989, and to discontinue service effective February 28, 1990.

== Time-sharing ==
Although IBM's Time Sharing Option (TSO) required VS2, customers with a 370/145 or 370/148 had other time-sharing options.
One combination was VM/CMS for time sharing, and a guest "machine" running OS/360 MFT II for batch.

=== Conversational Remote Job Entry ===
Optional component of OS/360 MFT II, OS/360 MVT and OS/VS1, CRJE allowed the user at a line-mode terminal to edit text datasets, submit jobs and access job output.

=== TONE for VS1 ===
A non-IBM time-sharing product named TONE (TSO-like, for VS1 / VS ONE) was marketed by Tone Software Co.
