= Job Entry Subsystem 1 =

IBM mainframe software

Job Entry Subsystem (JES), aka Job Entry Subsystem 1 (JES1), was released by IBM as an integral part of OS/VS1 as an enhancement to the basic functions that users of VS1's predecessor, MFT, had.

== History ==
IBM proclaimed JES1 to be "the single most important addition" to the job scheduling provided by VS1. IBM Systems Journal defined JES1's services as Spooling and scheduling, adding "Its three major components are peripheral services, central services, and queue management."

JES1 was not popular, because HASP and ASP users often had made local modifications (edits), and wanted to retain their investment.

== Features ==
JES1 permits operators to submit batch jobs from local unit record equipment.

In addition, Remote Entry Service (RES) permits remote operators to submit jobs from remote sites to JES. The printed and punched output of jobs running on OS/VS1, whether submitted locally or remotely, is handled by JES and may be routed to local devices, to the originating site or to another remote site. The Remote Entry Services (RES) of OS/VS1 is similar to Remote Job Entry (RJE) on OS/360 but the protocol for programmable workstations is that used by HASP II and Attached Support Processor (ASP) rather than that used by RJE.

=== New Features ===
- In MFT a reader or writer task tied up a partition; in JES1 a separate partition was required only while starting or stopping the task.
- In MFT each SPOOL file was a separate physical sequential (PS) dataset on public DASD; in JES1 SPOOL files are kept in a common SYS1.SYSPOOL dataset managed by JES1.
- In MFT a reader task could be delayed by interpreting tasks; in OS/VS1 the interpretation is done when the job is initiated.
- The JOB Card JCL was given a new option: TYPRUN=SCAN, whereby a job could be submitted for quick feedback, and - if no errors were detected - be submitted again (without TYPRUN=SCAN on the JOB Card.
- JES1 used a SubSystem Interface (SSI) similar to that in MVS.

=== Spooling ===
Job Entry Central Services (JECS) does its own I/O for files contained within SYS1.SYSPOOL and provides an Access Control Block (ACB) / Request Parameter List (RPL) (Note: VSAM and VTAM introduced te ACB as a replacement for the Data Control Block (DCB), and the RPL as a parameter for I/O macros using the ACB.) API to other services, e.g., Job Entry Peripheral Services (JEPS).

The term system input (SYSIN) refers to

- The JCL for a job
- Instream datasets in the job
- Procedures defined in the job.

A JEPS reader transcribes jobs to SPOOL using JECS but does not interpret them. It stores each instream dataset as a separate file.

The term system output (SYSOUT) refers to

- Print dataset written by the job
- Punch datasets written by the job
- Messsages written on behalf of the job, including an optional transcription of the JCL

A JEPS writer transcribes SYSOUT data set from SPOOL using JECS.

JES1 provides a Compatibility Interfaces that allows jobs to continue to use the old DCB interface; OPEN creates an ACB/RPL pair that the access method uses on behalf of the application.
