= System Generation (OS) =

Process for configuring some IBM operating systems

System Generation (SYSGEN) is a two-stage process for installing or updating OS/360, OS/VS1, OS/VS2 (SVS), OS/VS2 (MVS) and chargeable systems derived from them.

== Description ==
Stage 1 is the assembly of a sequence of user-written assembler macro instructions describing the configuration to be installed or updated. These macros generate job control language and utility control statements, in effect using the assembler as a general-purpose macro processor.

Stage 2 runs the job control from Stage 1, using a variety of utilities to do the actual building of the OS modules and creation of system libraries.

Installation and maintenance of software on IBM mainframes was known to be difficult in general, and the sysgen process was an attempt to automate parts of it..

There are several reasons that IBM provided a system generation process rather than simply providing a mechanism to restore the system from tape to disk. System/360 did not have self-identifying I/O devices, and the customer could request installation of I/O devices at arbitrary addresses. As a result, IBM had to provide a mechanism for the customer to define the I/O configuration to OS/360. Also, OS/360 supported several different options; IBM needed a way for the customer to select the code appropriate for the options needed at a particular installation. Definition of I/O devices could be modified and rerun later as needed to support configuration changes, a process called "IOGEN".

The sysgen process runs as a series of jobs under the control of the operating system. For new installations, IBM provided a complete pre-configured starter operating system, which is intended only for preparing for and running the sysgen, not for production use.

Prior to running the sysgen, the customer must initialize a set of distribution volumes and restore a set of distribution libraries from tape to those volumes. These libraries include data that the sysgen process will copy to target libraries, input to utilities used by the sysgen process, macro definitions used by the sysgen process and load modules that the sysgen process will include when linking load modules into target libraries.

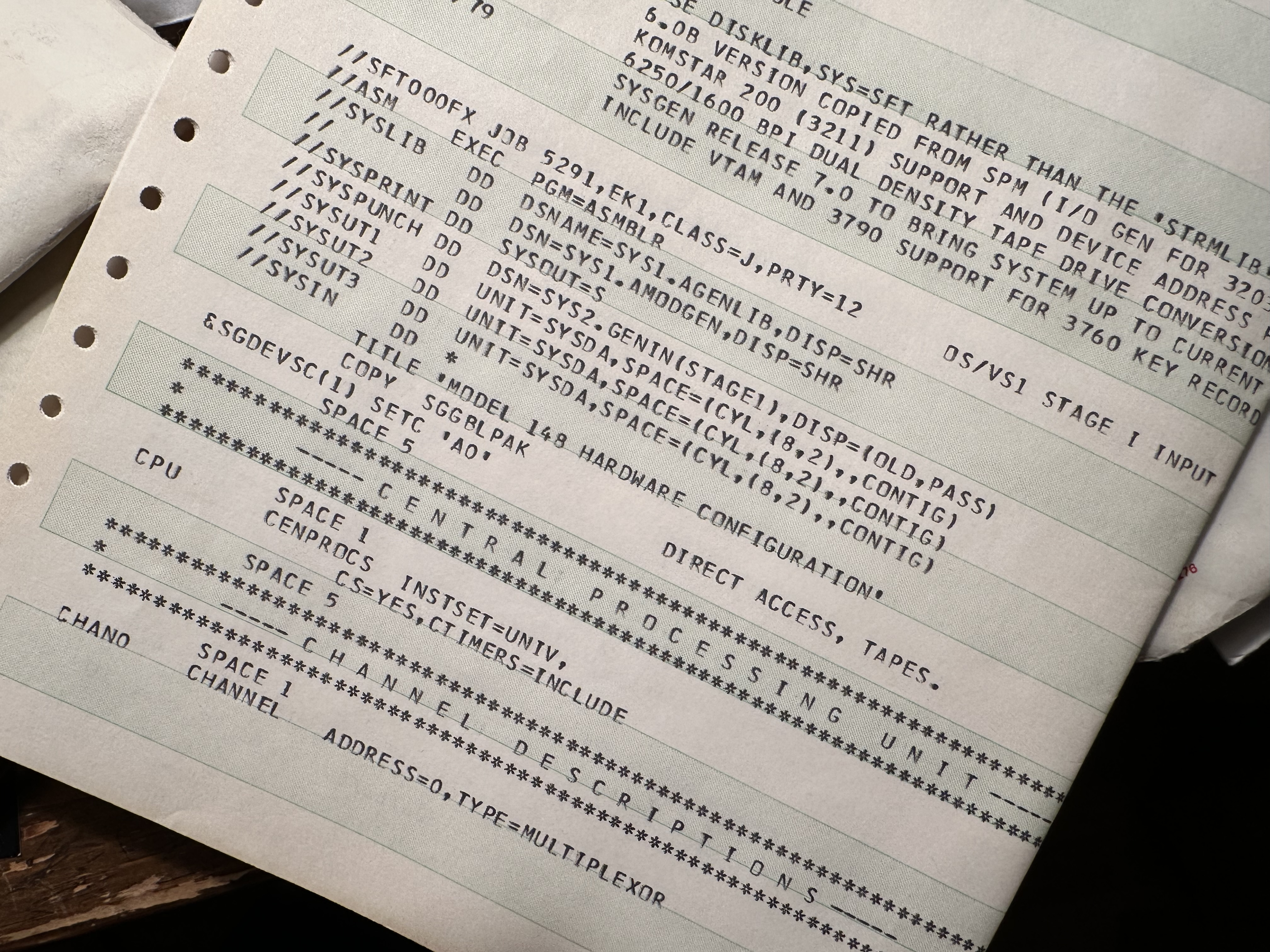
Start of the Stage 1 input assembler code for a Sysgen for a System 370/148 running OS/VS1, c. 1979

== Options ==
The TYPE keyword on the CTRLPROG macro in the Stage 1 input specifies the type of control program. By Release 13 the old terms SSS, MSS, and MPS had been replaced by PCP, MFT, and MVT. The later M65MP type is a variation of MVT.

The SCHEDULER macro in the Stage 1 input specifies the type of scheduler; Release 13 still used the values SEQUENTIAL and PRIORITY, but those were subsequently replaced by the values used for the TYPE keyword on the CTRLPROG macro.

These types are:

PCP
Primary Control Program (Option 1)
MFT
Multiprogramming with a Fixed number of Tasks (MFT) (Option 2)
MVT
Multiprogramming with a Variable number of Tasks (MVT) (Option 4)
M65MP
Model 65 Multi-Processing, a special case of MVT.

The GENERATE macro in the sysgen input can be any of several types:

- Full generation of the operating system.
- Generation of compilers and associated libraries.
- Updating of the I/O configuration

For MVT (either TYPE=MVT or TYPE=M65MP) with TSO, the TSOGEN macro plays the same role as GENERATE. Either macros analyzes the options specified on the previous macro calls and punches the Stage 2 job stream.

This process is now obsolete; it was initially replaced by the use of SMP/E, IOCP and MVSCP, then later by SMP/E and Hardware Configuration Definition (HCD).

== See also ==
- Software release life cycle
- Software deployment
