= Houston Automatic Spooling Priority =

The Houston Automatic Spooling Priority Program, commonly known as HASP, is an extension of the OS/360 and OS/VS2 (SVS) operating systems, providing extended support for "job management, data management, task management, and remote job entry." It was the basis for JES2 in MVS.

== History ==
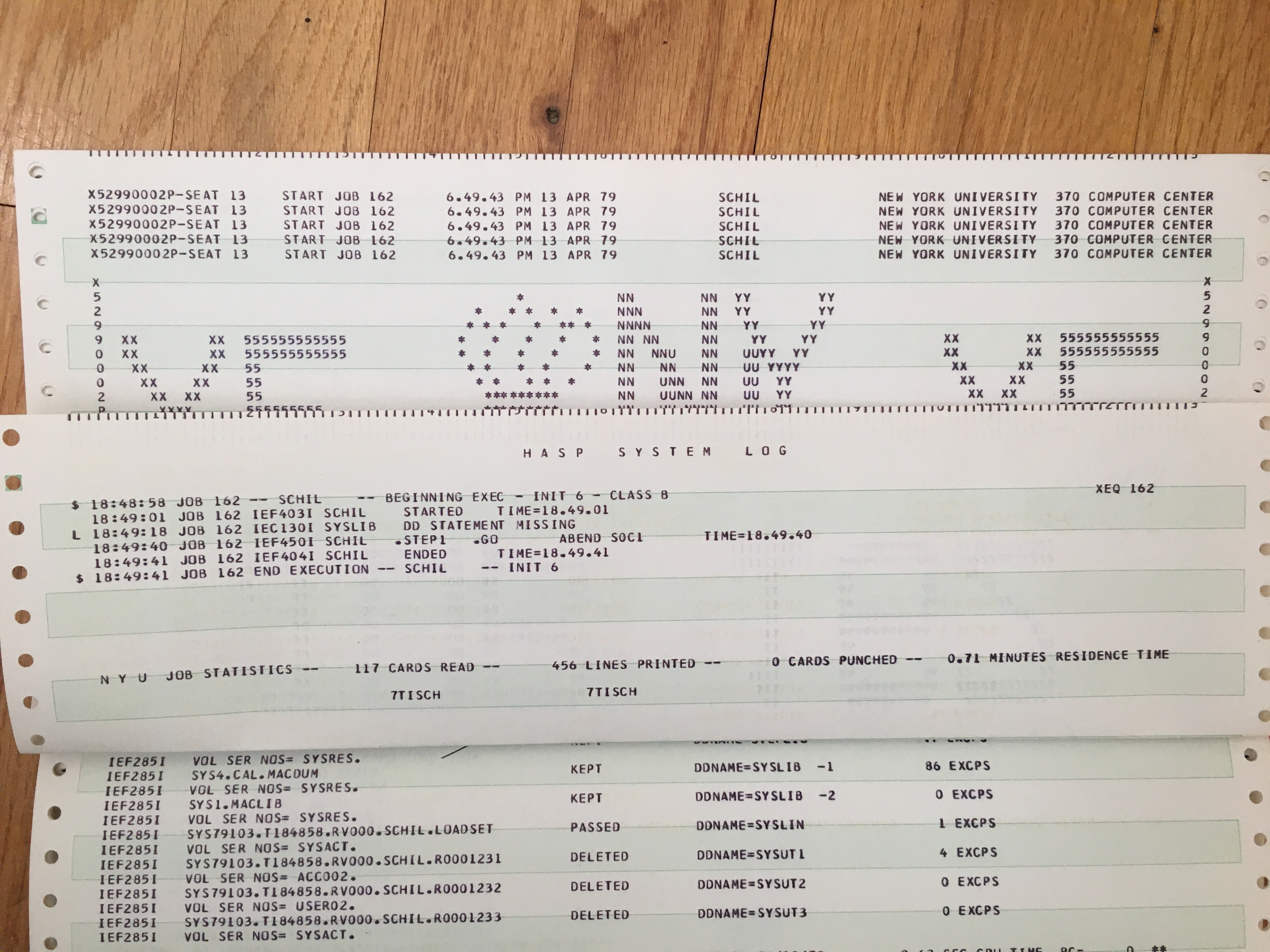
HASP system log as part of a batch job printout on an IBM System/370 at New York University, 1979

OS/360 included spooling routines, called reader/interpreters and output writers. Each reader/interpreter was "responsible for reading one input job stream" – that is one input device. Likewise each output writer was responsible for controlling one printer or punch. Spooled data were stored in OS temporary datasets controlled by standard OS services. Each reader/interpreter or output writer was a separate operating system task in its own partition or region. (Note: However, RJE and the later CRJE called the Reader/Interpreter as a subroutine and performed the functions of an output writer within its own partition/region.) A system with a large number of readers, printers, and punches might have a large number of spooling tasks.

HASP was developed by IBM Federal Systems Division contractors at the Lyndon B. Johnson Space Center in Houston. The developers were Tom Simpson and Bob Crabtree. HASP was a program that ran on a mainframe, and performed functions such as: scheduling, control of job flow, spooling and printing/punching. HASP had no support for IBM System/360 Operating System Remote Job Entry, 360S-RC-536, but provided roughly equivalent facilities of its own.

In HASP II V3, Roger Fajman, Bill Jones, and Jim Oberthaler of NIH created the shared spool capability for HASP that was used by many mainframe sites. It allowed each HASP system to share a common spool and checkpoint. This enabled workload balancing in a multi-mainframe environment. In HASP II V4, Don Greb and Dave Miko of Mellon Bank moved HASP shared spool to this version. Don Greb of Mellon Bank carried it forward into JES2 multi-access spool (IBM's formal support of HASP in MVS). Over 350 copies of the HASP II V4 shared spool mods were distributed around the world by Mellon Bank. The shared spool Mellon Mods were added to the SHARE distribution process so they could be more widely accessed. The "Mellon Mods" were the base for Jes/2 Multi Access Spool.

The program was sometimes referred to under various other names, but there is no indication of IBM ever using them in official documents.

The program became classified as part of the IBM Type-III Library. It had a competitor, ASP (Attached Support Processor), which ran on one mainframe and controlled scheduling of other attached mainframes. ASP later became JES3.

In MVS, HASP became JES2, one of two Job Entry Subsystems. It was many years before the HASP labels were removed from the JES2 source, and the messages issued by JES2 are still prefixed with "$HASP".

A modified version of HASP was used to provide batch spooling and remote job entry services for the Michigan Terminal System during the late 1960s, 1970s, and 1980s.

== Program organization ==
HASP bypassed most operating system services with code specially tailored for efficiency. HASP operated as a single operating system taskand used cooperative multitasking internally to run processors to perform tasks such as running card readers, printers, and punches, managing the spool files, communicating with the system operator, and driving multiple communication lines for remote job entry.

Hasp was written entirely in System/360 assembler and a typical HASP system might require 86KB of memory, which could be virtual memory on OS/VS systems.

=== Spooling ===
HASP uses one or more SPOOL volumes to contain jobs under its control. HASP stores spooled datasets in track groups on the SPOOL volumes, rather than as datasets known to the OS. A Sysgen for OS/360 or SVS must specify a pool of pseudo-devices, (Note: Device defined to the OS with addresses that do not correspond to installed hardware.) typically on different channels from the real devices. The access methods build the same channel programs as they would for real card readers, card punches and printers, but HASP intercepts the EXCP requests from the access methods. As HASP is reading the input stream, it modifies and stores the JCL on SPOOL volumes and stores each SYSIN data set separately. When HASP is ready to run the job, it passes the job to the Reader/Interpreter and an available Initiator selects it.

==== SYSIN ====
HASP recognizes each explicit DD *, explicit DD DATA and implicit DD * dataset and stores it on SPOOL volumes. During execution of a step, HASP assignes each SYSIN dataset to a pseudo-reader that the access methods treat as a real card reader, and intercepts the EXCP requests from the access method in order to provide card images from SPOOL. HASP simulates a unit exception after providing the last card image in the dataset.

==== SYSOUT ====
HASP changes each DD SYSOUT= data set as a reference to a pseudo printer or pseudo card punch. HASP intercpts each EXCP from the access methods, storing each card image and line image on SPOOL. After the job completes, a HASP printer, punch or remote processor that matches the selection criteria of a SYSOUT dataset copies it to an output device.

== pre-JES JECL ==
Much of what would become JES2's JECL was a part of HASP. HASP overloads delimiter statements (/*) as HASP control statements.

/*$command
Command statement
/*JOBPARM parameters
Job related HASP parameters
/*MESSAGE text
Send a message to the operator
OUTPUT code parameters
Form related HASP parameters
/*PRIORITY p
Priority of job
/*ROUTE type destination
Route PRINT|PUNCH output to destination LOCAL | PUNCH | RMTn | PRINTERn | PRINTRnn | PUNCHn
/*SETUP text
Send a message to the operator and hold the job until the operator releases it

== Remote job entry ==
Hasp originally supported IBM Synchronous Transmit-Receive (STR) batch terminals; however, HASP II dropped support for STR and only supported the Binary Synchronous Communications (BSC) protocol. HASP II supported IBM terminals such as 2770, 2780, 3770, 3780, but additionally provided support for multi-leaving communication with intelligent workstations such as the IBM 1130, IBM System/3 and the System/360 Model 20. Multi-leaving is "fully synchronous, pseudo-simultaneous, bi-directional transmission of a variable number of data streams between two or more computers utilizing binary-synchronous communications facilities."

Third party vendors developed a variety of 2770/2780/3780 simulators and Multi-leaving implementations for use with HASP and ASP. Some of these vendors incorrectly referred to their products as HASP emulators, but the products were actually terminals that talked to HASP; they did not perform any of the functions of HASP.

=== Operator Commands ===
The RJE console operator can enter a restricted set of HASP Console Operator Commands, each beginning with a $ (dollar sign).

Operands were restricted to those from this remote site, hence DJ1-999 (below) would only display typically a few, those still outstanding from the operator's remote site.

Some of the HASP RJE Console commands, which could be entered in short (single letter) form, or spelled out, are:

Short	Long	Operand(s)	Example
E	restart	device_name	E rm1.rdr
Z	stop	device_name	Z rm1.pr1
D	display	(J,I,& others)	e.g.
DJ	display job	Job Number (or range)	DJ345 or DJ1-999
DA	display active	(displayed active jobs)	DA
DI	display initiators	(displayed initiator letters)	DI
C	cancel	(Job or device_name)	e.g.
CJ	cancel job	Job Number	CJ678
C	cancel	device_name	C rm1.rdr

A command line "C rm1.rdr" was meant to cancel rather than submit the current deck of cards being read. This might have been of use if a card jam made it more sensible to let other jobs go ahead while one or more cards were replaced at a nearby keypunch.

== Job log ==
HASP job log output provided a summary of the resources used for the job (output appeared in all caps):

- Start time
- Stop time
- Execution time
- Memory usage
- Spool space used
- Cards read
- Cards punched
- Lines printed

== See also ==
- Remote Job Entry
- Job Entry Subsystem 2/3
- Peter G. Gyarmati
- Anthony James Barr
