= MVS Job Entry Subsystems =

Component of the z/OS operating system

A Job Entry Subsystem (JES) is a component of IBM's MVS (MVS/370 through z/OS) mainframe operating systems that is responsible for managing job-like workloads, e.g., batch, TSO sessions. There are two primary Job Entry Systems, called JES2 and JES3. They are designed to provide efficient execution of, e.g., batch jobs, interactive sessions. Starting with z/OS 3.1, released in September 2023, IBM z/OS no longer includes JES3, and comes with JES2 only – JES3 sites must either migrate to JES2, or license JES3plus from Phoenix Software International, who has taken over future support and development of JES3 from IBM. In addition, there is a Master Subsystem responsible for tasks that do not run under the control of a primary JES, e.g., the primary JES itself.

Job processing is divided into several phases to provide parallelism through pipelining. These phases include input processing where jobs are read and interpreted, the execution phase where jobs run, and output processing where job output is printed or stored on DASD. Jobs that are in the same phase of execution are usually said to reside on a particular queue; for example, jobs that are currently executing are on the execution queue.

To improve I/O efficiency, JES performs spooling, which provides multiple jobs with simultaneous access to a common storage volume. JES uses a structure called a checkpoint to backup information about currently executing jobs and their associated output. The checkpoint can be used to restore jobs and output in the event of unexpected hardware or software failures.

Although JES2 and JES3 provide the same core functionality, there are certain features that may be present in one JES but not the other. Because of these differences, one JES may be favored over the other in certain customer installations. JCL is used to define jobs to both JES2 and JES3, but small changes usually need to be made to the JCL to get a job written for one JES to run on the other. A common issue was that JES3 checked that all datasets listed in the JCL existed before execution or that there was a prior step where the dataset was defined as NEW,CATLG. JES2 did not insist on this, allowing the job to run even though it would fail when the step using it failed to find it.

== History ==
=== Precursors ===
OS/360's batch job processing had limited operational flexibility and performance, which was addressed by two field-developed packages called the Houston Automatic Spooling Priority (HASP) and the Attached Support Processor (ASP).

==== HASP ====
HASP was developed by IBM Federal Systems Division contractors at the Johnson Space Center in Houston. It originally managed job scheduling and print and punch output for a single OS/360 computer. Multi Access Spool capability was added to let peer computers share a common job queue and print/punch output queues.

With the introduction of System/370 in 1972, IBM rewrote HASP to become a standard part of the system and renamed it Job Entry Subsystem 2. JES2 was introduced in OS/VS2 in Release 2, also known as MVS, in 1973. It was many years before the HASP labels were removed from the source code, and the messages issued by JES2 are still prefixed with $HASP. Several JES2 commands continue to support specification of either JES2 or HASP to maintain backwards compatibility.

==== ASP ====
ASP initially stood for Attached Support Processor, (Note: Eventually renamed to Asymmetric Multiprocessing System) and was developed to provide efficient use of multiple systems with a shared workload. It allowed one central system to distribute jobs to multiple connected systems; ASP could run a mixture of OS/360, SVS and 7090 emulation on a 360/65 main processor, but only (Note: However, OS/360 on the 360/85 and SVS on S/370 supported integrated emulators.) OS/360 and SVS on other S/360 and S/370 models.. ASP was announced in March 1967, and that year was reported to be "running very stably".

ASP evolved from the design of the 7094/7040 Direct Coupled System, using data channel to data channel communication. By attaching an IBM 7040 as a peripheral, processor throughput was more than doubled.

In a typical ASP configuration, a small mainframe such as a 360/40 called the support system controlled one or more 360/65 or larger processors called main systems. The computers were connected through selector channels on each host attached to channel-to-channel adapters in an early form of short distance, point-to-point computer networking.

ASP required the purchase of an additional computer to manage input and output of the hosts running the job workload, which was economically justified by the high cost of standalone byte-multiplexor channels needed to drive printers and punched card reader devices; the 360/50 and smaller systems had a built-in byte multiplexor channel, whereas the faster 360/65 and larger systems required a relatively expensive standalone unit. Using ASP made it possible to avoid the cost of the byte multiplexor channel, and offloading the job scheduling, print, and card handling also offloaded those functions from the larger machines.

Increased reliability was another advantage to offset the added hardware cost. One or more main systems could fail or be taken offline for maintenance without taking down the whole complex.

ASP was primarily targeted at large government agencies and defense contractors that might have as many as six 360/65s all being scheduled and managed by a separate ASP machine. An uncommon variant, local ASP (LASP), was a single large machine with the ASP functions running on the same machine.

In the 1970s, a notable installation of ASP was at Princeton University controlling an IBM 360/91 mainframe.

In 1973, IBM rewrote ASP and renamed it JES3, supporting MVS only.

=== Alternatives ===
There was also a JES in OS/VS1 that was often referred to as JES1. In addition, the master (MSTR) subsystem, which is built into MVS, can start jobs that run outside of the control of the primary JES, including the Master Scheduler and the primary JES itself. Originally the JCL for the Master subsystem was in an IBM provided load modules, but in current versions of MVS through z/OS, it can be provided as a member of the system parameter library (PARMLIB).

=== Customization ===
Source code was provided to IBM customers for both ASP and HASP, and many customers made substantial enhancements to these programs, some of which were incorporated into the official product. Far more installations made use of HASP than ASP, and in contemporary z/OS systems, there are many more JES2 installations than JES3. Because of their unique history, IBM continues to ship JES2 and JES3 source code instead of object code, unlike most components of the operating system.

To improve maintainability and serviceability of user-written enhancements, JES provides a set of exit points that pass control from the JES to user programs at key points of processing. These extensions can provide custom functionality such as special commands, custom print page headings, and non-standard job processing.

=== Current development ===
In 2017, IBM released a statement of direction for JES2 to be the "strategic" JES, meaning that all future development efforts will be focused on JES2 rather than JES3. IBM has reassured customers that JES3 will continue to be supported until an end-of-support date is announced. In February 2019, IBM announced that z/OS 2.5 (expected to be released in 2021) will be the last version of z/OS to include JES3. In October 2019, Phoenix Software International announced that it had licensed the JES3 source code from IBM and would be taking over its maintenance and enhancement.

== Types of subsystem ==
A subsystem is either the Master subsystem (MSTR), a primary JES started under the control of MSTR or a secondary JES started under the control of the primary JES. The primary JES is responsible for running, e.g., APPC sessions, batch jobs, system tasks, TSO logons, except

1. The Master Subsystem
2. The primary JES
3. Tasks explicitly directed to MSTR
4. Workloads for testing a secondary JES.

== Subsystem interface (SSI) ==
The Subsystem interface (SSI) is a common interface for several dozen subsystems. The SSI is responsible for routing IEFSSREQ invocations to the proper subsystem, e.g., MSTR, JES2.

Various system components, e.g., Allocation, invoke SSI in order to allow subsystems to control processing.

== Subsystem datasets ==
Jobs may allocate datasets implemented by a subsystem either explicitly with a SUBSYS= keyword or implicitly. Subsystem datasets can be accessed directly with an ACB/RPL interface or indirectly with a DCB and the Compatibility Interface (CI).

=== SYSIN ===
A System Input (SYSIN) dataset is defined by a DD * or DD DATA statement processed by a primary or secondary JES. The owning JES maintains the data on SPOOL and provides access via ACB/RPL.

=== SYSOUT ===
A System Output (SYSOUT) dataset is defined by a DD SYSOUT= statement processed by a primary or secondary JES or an equivalent dynamic allocation. The owning JES maintains the data on SPOOL and provides access via ACB/RPL. The MSTR subsystem can allocate SYSOUT datasets managed by a different subsystem.

== Converter/Interpreter (C/I) ==
The Converter/Interpreter (C/I) is a highly modified version of the Reader/Interpreter (R/I) of OS/360 and SVS. A subsystem may invoke the C/I as a unit or may invoke the Converter and Interpreter separately.

=== Converter ===
The converter parses an input stream and converts the JCL into internal text. Roughly, each syntactical element has a key and a value. Range checking of the values is generally deferred to the Interpreter. The Converter is responsible for merging cataloged procedure into the job stream.

=== Interpreter ===
The Interpreter does validity checking on text units and compiles them into control blocks. Depending on the subsystem invoking the Converter, the output control blocks may reside in System Work Area (SWA) or in SPOOL datasets.

== Master subsystem (MSTR) ==
The master subsystem (MSTR) only processes system tasks, not batch jobs. In particular, MSTR process the START of the primary JES. There is an operand on the START command to force a started task that would normally run under the primary JES to run under MSTR.

== See also ==
- System Display and Search Facility (SDSF) most common utility to interact with JES2
