= MVS =

Operating system for IBM mainframes

Multiple Virtual Storage (MVS)
- Developer: IBM
- Written in: Assembler (XF), PL/S
- OS family: OS/360
- Initial release: 1974; 52 years ago
- Marketing target: IBM mainframe computers
- Available in: English
- Supported platforms: System/370, System/390
- Influenced by: TSS
- License: Proprietary; Initially free
- Preceded by: OS/VS2 (SVS)
- Succeeded by: MVS/SE, MVS/SP, MVS/XA, MVS/ESA, OS/390, z/OS

Multiple Virtual Storage (MVS) is the most commonly used operating system on the System/370, System/390 and IBM Z IBM mainframe computers. IBM developed MVS, along with OS/VS1 and SVS, as a successor to OS/360. It is unrelated to IBM's other mainframe operating system lines, e.g., VSE, VM, TPF.

== Overview ==
First released in 1974, MVS was extended by program products with new names multiple times, retaining the term MVS in the nomenclature:

- first to MVS/SE (MVS/System Extensions), (Note: some print media used the singular, MVS/System Extension: Computerworld, 15 Dec 1980 - Page 5; 26 June 1978 - Page 8)
- next to MVS/SP (MVS/System Product) Version 1,
- next to MVS/XA (MVS/eXtended Architecture),
- next to MVS/ESA (MVS/Enterprise Systems Architecture),

and then extended

- to OS/390 for the System/390 systems, and
- finally to z/OS (when 64-bit support was added with the zSeries models). IBM added UNIX support (originally called OpenEdition MVS) in MVS/SP V4.3 and has obtained POSIX and UNIX™ certifications at several different levels from IEEE, X/Open and The Open Group. The MVS core remains fundamentally the same operating system. By design, programs written for MVS run on z/OS without modification.

At first IBM described MVS as simply a new release of OS/VS2, but it is, in fact a major rewrite. OS/VS2 release 1 is an upgrade of OS/360 MVT that retained most of the original code and, like MVT, is mainly written in assembly language. The MVS core is almost entirely written in Assembler XF, although a few modules were written in PL/S, but not the performance-sensitive ones, in particular not the Input/Output Supervisor (IOS). IBM's use of "OS/VS2" emphasized upwards compatibility: application programs that ran under MVT did not even need recompiling to run under MVS. The same Job Control Language files could be used unchanged; utilities and other non-core facilities like TSO ran unchanged. IBM and users almost unanimously called the new system MVS from the start, and IBM continued to use the term MVS in the naming of later major versions such as MVS/XA.

== Evolution of MVS ==
OS/360 MFT (Multiprogramming with a Fixed number of Tasks) provides multiprogramming: several memory partitions, each of a fixed size, are set up when the operating system is installed and when the operator redefines them. For example, there could be a small partition, two medium partitions, and a large partition. If there were two large programs ready to run, one would have to wait until the other finished and vacated the large partition. OS/360 R19 added MFT sub-tasking (multitasking), the ability for a job to dynamically create new tasks with the ATTACH macro.

OS/360 MVT (Multiprogramming with a Variable number of Tasks) was an enhancement that further refined memory use. Instead of using fixed-size memory partitions, MVT allocates memory to regions for job steps as needed, provided enough contiguous physical memory is available. This is a significant advance over MFT's memory management, but has some weaknesses: if a job allocates memory dynamically (as most sort programs and database management systems do), the programmers has to estimate the job's maximum memory requirement and pre-define it for MVT. A job step that contains a mix of small and large programs wastes memory while the small programs run. Most seriously, memory can become fragmented, i.e., the memory not used by current jobs could be divided into uselessly small chunks between the areas used by current jobs, and the only remedy was to wait until some current jobs finished before starting any new ones.

In the early 1970s IBM sought to mitigate these difficulties by introducing virtual memory (which IBM called "virtual storage"), which allowed programs to request address spaces larger than physical memory. The original implementations had a single virtual address space, shared by all jobs. OS/VS1 is OS/360 MFT within a single virtual address space; OS/VS2 SVS was OS/360 MVT within a single virtual address space. So OS/VS1 and SVS in principle had the same disadvantages as MFT and MVT, but the impacts are less severe because jobs and operators could request much larger partitions with a 2 KiB granularity (for OS/VS1) or regions with a 4 KiB granularity (for SVS), and the requests came out of a 16MiB address space even if physical storage was smaller. As in OS/360 MVT, TSO users in SVS are assigned to a TSO region during login processing and competed with other users assigned to the same region, with essentially the same swap-in and swap-out logic as TSO in MVT.

MVS address spaces - global view
MVS (shared part of all address spaces)
App 1	App 2	App 3
Shared virtual area (controlled by MVS)

One application's view
MVS
App 1
Shared virtual area

In the mid-1970s IBM introduced MVS, which not only supported virtual storage that was larger than the available real storage, (Note: Some processors could take more physical storage than the size of a single address space, but still much smaller than the aggregate size of a typical workload's virtual storage.) as did SVS, but also allowed an indefinite number of applications to run in different address spaces. Two concurrent programs might try to access the same virtual memory address, but the virtual memory system redirected these requests to different areas of physical memory. Each of these address spaces consisted of three areas: an operating system (one instance shared by all jobs), an application area unique for each application, and a shared virtual area used for various purposes, including inter-job communication. IBM promised that application areas would always be at least 8MB. This made MVS the perfect solution for business problems that resulted from the need to run more applications.

MVS maximized processing potential by providing multiprogramming and multiprocessing capabilities. Like its MVT and OS/VS2 SVS predecessors, MVS supported multiprogramming; program instructions and associated data are scheduled by a control program and given processing cycles. Unlike a single-programming operating system, these systems maximize the use of the processing potential by dividing processing cycles among the instructions associated with several different concurrently running programs. This way, the control program does not have to wait for the I/O operation to complete before proceeding. By executing the instructions for multiple programs, the computer is able to switch back and forth between active and inactive programs.

Early editions of MVS (mid-1970s) are among the first of the IBM OS series to support multiprocessor configurations, though the M65MP variant of OS/360 running on 360 Models 65 and 67 had provided limited multiprocessor support. The 360 Model 67 had also hosted the multiprocessor capable TSS/360, MTS and CP-67 operating systems. Because multiprocessing systems can execute instructions simultaneously, they offer greater processing power than single-processing system. As a result, MVS was able to address the business problems brought on by the need to process large amounts of data.

Multiprocessing systems are either loosely coupled, which means that each computer has access to a common workload, or tightly coupled, which means that the computers share the same real storage and are controlled by a single copy of the operating system. MVS retained both the loosely coupled multiprocessing of Attached Support Processor (ASP) (Note: Via Job Entry Subsystem 3 (JES3)) and the tightly coupled multiprocessing of OS/360 Model 65 Multiprocessing. In tightly coupled systems, two CPUs shared concurrent access to the same memory (and copy of the operating system) and peripherals, providing greater processing power and a degree of graceful degradation if one CPU failed. In loosely coupled configurations each of a group of processors (single and / or tightly coupled) had its own memory and operating system but shared peripherals and the operating system component JES3 allowed managing the whole group from one console. This provided greater resilience and let operators decide which processor should run which jobs from a central job queue. MVS JES3 gave users the opportunity to network together two or more data processing systems via shared disks and Channel-to-Channel Adapters (CTCA's). This capability eventually became available to JES2 users as Multi-Access SPOOL (MAS).

MVS originally supported 24-bit addressing (i.e., up to 16MB). As the underlying hardware progressed, it supported 31-bit (XA and ESA; up to 2048MB) and now (as z/OS) 64-bit addressing. The most significant motives for the rapid upgrade to 31-bit addressing were the growth of large transaction-processing networks, mostly controlled by CICS, which ran in a single address space—and the DB2 relational database management system needed more than 8MB of application address space to run efficiently. (Early versions were configured into two address spaces that communicated via the shared virtual area, but this imposed a significant overhead since all such communications had transmit via the operating system.)

The main user interfaces to MVS are: Job Control Language (JCL), which was originally designed for batch processing but from the 1970s onwards was also used to start and allocate resources to long-running interactive jobs such as CICS; and TSO (Time Sharing Option), the interactive time-sharing interface, which was mainly used to run development tools and a few end-user information systems. ISPF is a TSO application for users on 3270-family terminals (and later, on VM as well), which allows the user to accomplish the same tasks as TSO's command line but in a menu and form oriented manner, and with a full screen editor and file browser. TSO's basic interface is command line, although facilities, such as ISPF, were added later for form-driven interfaces.

MVS took a major step forward in fault-tolerance, built on the earlier STAE facility, that IBM called software recovery. IBM decided to do this after years of practical real-world experience with MVT in the business world. System failures were now having major impacts on customer businesses, and IBM decided to take a major design jump, to assume that despite the very best software development and testing techniques, that 'problems WILL occur.' This assumption was pivotal in adding great percentages of fault-tolerance code to the system and likely contributed to the system's success in tolerating software and hardware failures.

This design specified a hierarchy of error-handling programs, in system (kernel/'privileged') mode, called Functional Recovery Routines, and in user ('task' or 'problem program') mode, called "ESTAE" (Extended Specified Task Abnormal Exit routines) that are invoked in case the system detected an error (hardware processor or storage error, or software error). Each recovery routine made the 'mainline' function reinvokable, captured error diagnostic data sufficient to debug the causing problem, and either 'retried' (reinvoke the mainline) or 'percolated' (escalated error processing to the next recovery routine in the hierarchy).

Thus, with each error the system captured diagnostic data, and attempted to perform a repair and keep the system up. The worst thing possible was to take down a user address space (a 'job') in the case of unrepaired errors. Though it was an initial design point, it was not until the most recent MVS version (z/OS), that recovery program was not only guaranteed its own recovery routine, but each recovery routine now has its own recovery routine. This recovery structure was embedded in the basic MVS control program, and programming facilities are available and used by application program developers and 3rd party developers.

Practically, the MVS software recovery made problem debugging both easier and more difficult. Software recovery requires that programs leave 'tracks' of where they are and what they are doing, thus facilitating debugging—but the fact that processing progresses despite an error can overwrite the tracks. Early data capture at the time of the error maximizes debugging, and facilities exist for the recovery routines (task and system mode, both) to do this.

IBM included additional criteria for a major software problem that required IBM service. If a mainline component failed to initiate software recovery, that was considered a valid reportable failure. Also, if a recovery routine failed to collect significant diagnostic data such that the original problem was solvable by data collected by that recovery routine, IBM standards dictated that this fault was reportable and required repair. Thus, IBM standards, when rigorously applied, encouraged continuous improvement.

IBM continued to support the major serviceability tool Dynamic Support System (DSS) that it had introduced in OS/VS1 and OS/VS2 Release 1. This interactive facility could be invoked to initiate a session to create diagnostic procedures, or invoke already-stored procedures. The procedures trapped special events, such as the loading of a program, device I/O, system procedure calls, and then triggered the activation of the previously defined procedures. These procedures, which could be invoked recursively, allowed for reading and writing of data, and alteration of instruction flow. Program Event Recording hardware was used.

IBM dropped support for DSS with Selectable Unit 7 (SU7), an update to OS/VS2 Release 3.7 required by the program product OS/VS2 MVS/System Extensions (MVS/SE), Program Number 5740-XEl. The User group SHARE passed a requirement that IBM reinstate DSS, and IBM provided a PTF to allow use of DSS after MVS/SE was installed.

IBM again dropped support for DSS with SU64, an update to OS/VS2 Release 3.8 required by Release 2 of MVS/SE.

Program-Event Recording (PER) exploitation was performed by the enhancement of the diagnostic SLIP command with the introduction of the PER support (SLIP/Per) in SU 64/65 (1978).

Multiple copies of MVS (or other IBM operating systems) could share the same machine if that machine was controlled by VM/370. In this case VM/370 was the real operating system, and regarded the "guest" operating systems as applications with unusually high privileges. As a result of later hardware enhancements one instance of an operating system (either MVS, or VM with guests, or other) could also occupy a Logical Partition (LPAR) instead of an entire physical system.

Multiple MVS instances can be organized and collectively administered in a structure called a systems complex or sysplex, introduced in September, 1990. Instances interoperate through a software component called a Cross-system Coupling Facility (XCF) and a hardware component called a Hardware Coupling Facility (CF or Integrated Coupling Facility, ICF, if co-located on the same mainframe hardware). Multiple sysplexes can be joined via standard network protocols such as IBM's proprietary Systems Network Architecture (SNA) or, more recently, via TCP/IP. The z/OS operating system (MVS' most recent descendant) also has native support to execute POSIX and Single UNIX Specification applications. The support began with MVS/SP V4R3, and IBM has obtained UNIX 95 certification for z/OS V1R2 and later.

The system is typically used in business and banking, and applications are often written in COBOL. COBOL programs were traditionally used with transaction processing systems like IMS and CICS. For a program running in CICS, special EXEC CICS statements are inserted in the COBOL source code. A preprocessor (translator) replaces those EXEC CICS statements with the appropriate COBOL code to call CICS before the program is compiled — not altogether unlike SQL used to call DB2. Applications can also be written in other languages such as C, C++, Java, assembly language, FORTRAN, BASIC, RPG, and REXX. Language support is packaged as a common component called "Language Environment" or "LE" to allow uniform debugging, tracing, profiling, and other language independent functions.

MVS systems are traditionally accessed by 3270 terminals or by PCs running 3270 emulators. However, many mainframe applications these days have custom web or GUI interfaces. The z/OS operating system has built-in support for TCP/IP. System management, done in the past with a 3270 terminal, is now done through the Hardware Management Console (HMC) and, increasingly, Web interfaces. Operator consoles are provided through 2074 emulators, so you are unlikely to see any S/390 or zSeries processor with a real 3270 connected to it.

The native character encoding scheme of MVS and its peripherals is EBCDIC, but the TR instruction made it easy to translate to other 7- and 8-bit codes. Over time IBM added hardware-accelerated services to perform translation to and between larger codes, hardware-specific service for Unicode transforms and software support of, e.g., ASCII, ISO/IEC 8859, UTF-8, UTF-16, and UTF-32. The software translation services take source and destination code pages as inputs.

== MVS filesystem ==
Files, other than Unix files, are properly called data sets in MVS. Names of those files are organized in catalogs that are VSAM files themselves.

Data set names (DSNs, mainframe term for filenames) are organized in a hierarchy whose levels are separated with dots, e.g. "DEPT01.SYSTEM01.FILE01". Each level in the hierarchy can be up to eight characters long. The total filename length is a maximum of 44 characters including dots. By convention, the components separated by the dots are used to organize files similarly to directories in other operating systems. For example, there are utility programs that performed similar functions to those of Windows Explorer (but without the GUI and usually in batch processing mode) - adding, renaming or deleting new elements and reporting all the contents of a specified element. However, unlike in many other systems, these levels are not usually (Note: The exceptions are mostly CVOL and user catalog alias names at the beginning of a dataset name.) actual directories but just a naming convention (like the original Macintosh File System, where folder hierarchy was an illusion maintained by the Finder). TSO supports a default prefix for files (similar to a "current directory" concept), and RACF supports setting up access controls based on filename patterns, analogous to access controls on directories on other platforms.

As with other members of the OS family, MVS' data sets are record-oriented. MVS inherited three main types from its predecessors:

- Sequential data sets were normally read one record at a time from beginning to end.
- In BDAM (direct access) data sets, the application program had to specify the physical location of the data it wanted to access (usually by specifying the offset from the start of the data set).
- In ISAM data sets a specified section of each record was defined as a key that could be used as a key to look up specific records. The key quite often consisted of multiple fields but these had to be contiguous and in the right order; and key values had to be unique. Hence an IBM ISAM file could have only one key, equivalent to the primary key of a relational database table; ISAM could not support foreign keys.

Sequential and ISAM datasets could store either fixed-length or variable length records, and all types could occupy more than one disk volume.

All of these are based on the VTOC disk structure.

Early IBM database management systems used various combinations of ISAM and BDAM datasets - usually BDAM for the actual data storage and ISAM for indexes.

In the early 1970s IBM's virtual memory operating systems introduced a new file management component, VSAM, which provided similar facilities:

- Entry-Sequenced Datasets (ESDS) provided facilities similar to those of both sequential and BDAM datasets, since they could be read either from start to finish or directly by specifying an offset from the start.
- Key-Sequenced Datasets (KSDS) are a major upgrade from ISAM: they allow secondary keys with non-unique values and keys formed by concatenating non-contiguous fields in any order; they greatly reduced the performance problems caused by overflow records in ISAM; and they greatly reduced the risk that a software or hardware failure in the middle of an index update might corrupt the index.

These VSAM formats became the basis of IBM's database management systems, IMS/VS and DB2 - usually ESDS for the actual data storage and KSDS for indexes.

VSAM also included a catalog component used for user catalogs and MVS' master catalog.

Partitioned data sets (PDS) are sequential data sets subdivided into "members" that could each be processed as sequential files in their own right (like a folder in a file system). The most important use of PDSes was for program libraries - system administrators used the main PDS as a way to allocate disk space to a project and the project team then created and edited the members. Other uses of PDSs are libraries of frequently used job control procedures (PROCs), and "copy books" of programming language statements such as record definitions used by several programs.

Generation Data Groups (GDGs) are groups of like named data sets, which can be referenced by absolute generation number, or by an offset from the most recent generation. They were originally designed to support grandfather-father-son backup procedures - if a file was modified, the changed version became the new "son", the previous "son" became the "father", the previous "father" became the "grandfather" and the previous "grandfather" was deleted. But one could set up GDGs with more than 3 generations and some applications used GDGs to collect data from several sources and feed the information to one program - each collecting program created a new generation of the file and the final program read the whole group as a single sequential file (by not specifying a generation in the JCL).

Modern versions of MVS (e.g., z/OS) use datasets as containers for Unix filesystems along with facilities for partially integrating them. That is, Unix programs using fopen() can access an MVS dataset and a user can allocate a Unix file as though it were a dataset, with some (Note: E.g., IBM does not support using a concatenation of PDSs and Unix directories.) restrictions. The Hierarchical File System (HFS) (not to be confused with Apple's Hierarchical File System) uses a unique type of dataset, while the newer z/OS File System (zFS) (not to be confused with Sun's ZFS) uses a VSAM Linear Data Set (LDS).

Programs running on network-connected computers (such as the IBM AS/400) can use local data management interfaces to transparently create, manage, and access VSAM record-oriented files by using client-server products implemented according to Distributed Data Management Architecture (DDM). DDM is also the base architecture for the MVS DB2 server that implements Distributed Relational Database Architecture (DRDA).

=== Virtual I/O (VIO) ===
MVS includes a facility called Virtual I/O (VIO), with which temporary datasets can be stored in simulated tracks on the paging datasets, facilitating the use of existing access methods and eliminating the overhead of allocation but adding more processing overhead than needed for real DASD or for a memory mapped file system.

== Upgrades to MVS ==
In addition to new functionality that IBM added with releases and sub-releases of OS/VS2, IBM provided a number of free Incremental Change Releases (ICRs) and Selectable Units (SUs) and chargeable program products and field developed programs that IBM eventually bundled as part of z/OS. These include:

MVS SU Numbers
SU	SUID	SU name
1	5752-801	VTAM2
2	5752-802	TCAM 10
3	5752-803	JES2 Release 4
4	5752-804	Scheduler Improvements
5	5752-805	Supervisor Performance 1
6	5752-806	168AP
7	5752-807	Supervisor Performance 2
8	5752-808	Data Management Enhancements
9	5752-809	
10	5752-810	3800 Support
12	5752-812	JES3 Release 2
13	5752-813	TSO/VTAM
15	5752-815	SMP
16	5752-816	Scheduler/IOS Support
17	5752-817	Service Data Improvements
18	5752-818	JES3 Release 3.1 MSS
21	5752-821	SSS Release 4
24	5752-824	3850 MSS Programming Enhancements
25	5752-825	JES2 Release 4.1 RJE 3790 Support
26	5752-826	JES3 RJP
27	5752-827	EREP Modifications
29	5752-829	3838 VPSS
30	5752-830	3895 Deposit System
32	5752-832	System Security Support
33	5752-833	MVS Dumping Improvements
36	5752-836	TCAM Direct (TCAM 10)
37	5752-837	SSS Release 5 TCAM Direct
47	5752-847	158/168 AP
48	5752-848	3800 12 Lines Per Inch
51	5752-851	Processor Support
55	5752-855	Hardware Recovery Enhancements
57	5752-857	IPCS
58	5752-858	TSO/VTAM Level 2
60	5752-860	Data Management Support
63	5752-863	SMP Release 3
64	5752-864	Processor Support 2
68	5752-868	DEMF (Display Exceprion Monitoring Program)

- ACF/TCAM (5735-RCl)
- ACF/VTAM (5746-RC3, 5735-RC2)
- Data Facility/Device Support (DF/DS), 5740-AM7
- Data Facility Extended Function (DF/EF), 5740-XYQ
- Data Facility/Data Set Services (DF/DSS), 5740-UT3.
- Data Facility Sort, 5740-SM1
- OS/VS2 MVS Sequential Access Method-Extended (SAM-E), 5740-AM3
- MVS/370 Data Facility Product (DFP), 5665-295, replacing
  - 5740-AM7 Data Facility Device Support (DFDS)
  - 5740-XYQ Data Facility Extended Function (DFEF)
  - 5740-AM3 Sequential Access Method Extended (SAM-E)
  - 5740-AM8 Access Method Services Cryptographic Option
  - 5748-UT2 Offline 3800 Utility
- MVS/XA Data Facility Product Version 1 Release 1, 5665-284
- MVS/XA Data Facility Product Version 2 Release 1, 5665-XA2
- MVS/ESA Data Facility Product Version 3, 5665-XA3
- Data Facility Storage Management Subsystem (DFSMS), 5695-DF1
  Replaces DFP, DF/DSS and DF/HSM
- OS/VS2 MVS TSO Command Package (5740-XT6)
- TSO Command Processor - FDP 5798-AYF (PRINT command)
- TSO/VS2 Programming Control Facility - FDP 5798-BBJ
- TSO Programming Control Facility - II (PCF II), FDP 5798-CLW,
- TSO Extensions
  Replaces TSO Command Package, TSO Command Processor and PCF
  - 5665-285 for MVS/370
  - 5665-293 for MVS/XA
  - 5685-025 for MVS/XA
    First version with REXX
- OS/VS2 MVS/System Extensions, 5740-XEl
- MVS/System Product
  - JES3 Version 1 5740-XYN
  - JES2 Version 1 5740-XYS
  - MVS/System Product-JES2 Version 2, 5740-XC6
  - MVS/System Product-JES3 Version 2, 5665-291
  - MVS/System Product-JES2 Version 3, 5685-001
  - MVS/System Product-JES3 Version 3, 5685-002
  - MVS/ESA System Product: JES2 Version 4, 5695-047
  - MVS/ESA System Product: JES3 Version 4, 5695-048
  - MVS/ESA System Product: JES2 Version 5, 5655-068
  - MVS/ESA System Product: JES3 Version 5, 5655-069

== Data Facility Product (DFP) ==
In the late seventies and early eighties IBM announced:

- 5740-AM7 Data Facility Device Support (DF/DS)
- 5740-XYQ Data Facility Extended Function (DF/EF)
- 5740-AM3 Sequential Access Method Extended (SAM-E)
- 5740-AM8 Access Method Services Cryptographic Option
- 5748-UT2 Offline 3800 Utility

DF/DS added new device support, and IBM announced that it would no longer add device support to the free base. DF/EF added the Improved Catalog Structure (ICF) as an alternative to VSAM catalogs and Control Volumes (CVOLs), but it was riddled with reliability problems.

When IBM announced MVS/SP Version 2 (MVS/XA), it also announced Data Facility Product™ (DFP™) as a replacement for and upgrade to the other five products above, which it said would be withdrawn from marketing, effective December 1, 1984. DFP/370 Release 1 (program number 5665-295), announced June 7, 1983, was for MVS/SP Version 1, MVS/SE and OS/VS2 R3.8, and was optional, but MVS/Extended Architecture Data Facility Product (5665-284) was a corequisite for MVS/SP Version 2 (MVS/XA). In addition to enhancing data management facilities, DFP replaced free versions of the linkage editor and utilities.

DFP is no longer available as a separate product, but has become part of Data Facility Storage Management Subsystem, under the name DFSMSdfp.

== Modern MVS ==
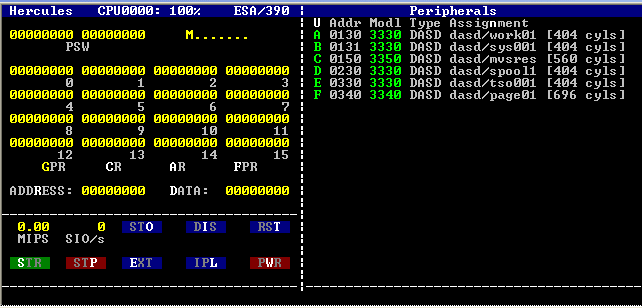
MVS running on the Hercules emulator

MVS has now evolved into z/OS; older MVS releases are no longer supported by IBM and, since 2007, only 64-bit z/OS releases are supported. z/OS supports running older 24-bit and 31-bit MVS applications alongside newer 64-bit applications.

MVS releases up to 3.8j (24-bit, released in 1981) were freely available and it is now possible to run the MVS 3.8j release in mainframe emulators for free, such as the Hercules emulator.

== MVS/370 ==
MVS/370 is a generic term for all versions of the MVS operating system prior to MVS/XA. (Note: OS/VS2 Release 2 through 3.8, MVS/SE and MVS/SP Version 1) The System/370 architecture, at the time MVS was released, supported only 24-bit virtual addresses, so the MVS/370 operating system architecture is based on a 24-bit address. Because of this 24-bit address length, programs running under MVS/370 are each given 16 MB of contiguous virtual storage.

== MVS/XA ==
MVS/XA, or Multiple Virtual Storage/Extended Architecture, was a version of MVS that supported the 370-XA architecture, which had a new I/O architecture and also expanded addresses from 24 bits to 31 bits, providing a 2 gigabyte addressable memory area. MVS/XA supported a 24-bit legacy addressing mode for older 24-bit applications (i.e. those that stored a 24-bit address in the lower 24 bits of a 32-bit word and utilized the upper 8 bits of that word for other purposes).

== MVS/ESA ==
MVS Enterprise System Architecture (MVS/ESA) is any version of MVS prior to OS/390 that supports S/370 Enterprise Systems Architecture (S/370-ESA). MVS/ESA extends the 24-bit and 31-bit addressing modes of MVS/XA by adding an access register (AR) mode for references between address spaces.

IBM introduced MVS/ESA as MVS/SP Version 3 in February 1988, then MVS/ESA SP Version 4 and MVS/ESA SP Version 5. IBM replaced it with OS/390 in late 1995 and subsequently with z/OS.

MVS/ESA OpenEdition: upgrade to Version 4 Release 3 of MVS/ESA SP announced February 1993 with support for POSIX and other standards. While the initial release only had National Institute of Standards and Technology (NIST) certification for Federal Information Processing Standard (FIPS) 151 compliance, subsequent releases were certified at higher levels and by other organizations, e.g. X/Open and its successor, The Open Group. It included about 1 million new lines of code, which provide an API shell, utilities, and an extended user interface. Works with a hierarchical file system provided by DFSMS (Data Facility System Managed Storage). The shell and utilities are based on Mortice Kerns' InterOpen products. Independent specialists estimate that it was over 80% open systems-compliant—more than most Unix systems. DCE2 support announced February 1994, and many application development tools in March 1995. From mid 1995, as all of the open features became a standard part of vanilla MVS/ESA SP Version 5 Release 1, IBM stopped distinguishing OpenEdition from the operating system. Under OS/390 V2R6 it became UNIX System Services, and has kept that name under z/OS.

== OS/390 ==
In late 1995 IBM bundled MVS with several program products and changed the name from MVS/ESA to OS/390.

== z/OS ==
The current level of MVS is marketed as z/OS.

== Closely related operating systems ==
Japanese mainframe manufacturers Fujitsu and Hitachi both repeatedly and illegally obtained IBM's MVS source code and internal documentation in one of the 20th century's most famous cases of industrial espionage. Fujitsu relied heavily on IBM's code in its MSP mainframe operating system, and likewise Hitachi did the same for its VOS3 operating system. MSP and VOS3 were heavily marketed in Japan, where they still hold a substantial share of the mainframe installed base, but also to some degree in other countries, notably Australia. Even IBM's bugs and documentation misspellings were faithfully copied. IBM cooperated with the U.S. Federal Bureau of Investigation in a sting operation, reluctantly supplying Fujitsu and Hitachi with proprietary MVS and mainframe hardware technologies during the course of multi-year investigations culminating in the early 1980s—investigations which implicated senior company managers and even some Japanese government officials. Amdahl, however, was not involved in Fujitsu's theft of IBM's intellectual property. Any communications from Amdahl to Fujitsu were through "Amdahl Only Specifications" which were scrupulously cleansed of any IBM IP or any references to IBM's IP.

Subsequent to the investigations, IBM reached multimillion-dollar settlements with both Fujitsu and Hitachi, collecting substantial fractions of both companies' profits for many years. Reliable reports indicate that the settlements exceeded US$500,000,000. (Note: the Congressional testimony, near the end, only says "Hitachi has yet to admit that any of IBM's secrets were used in the development of new products, and they have not yet compensated IBM for the huge expenses involved in settling the case.")

The three companies have long since amicably agreed to many joint business ventures. For example, in 2000 IBM and Hitachi collaborated on developing the IBM z900 mainframe model.

Because of this historical copying, MSP and VOS3 are properly classified as "forks" of MVS, and many third-party software vendors with MVS-compatible products were able to produce MSP- and VOS3-compatible versions with little or no modification.

When IBM introduced its 64-bit z/Architecture mainframes in the year 2000, IBM also introduced the 64-bit z/OS operating system, the direct successor to OS/390 and MVS. Fujitsu and Hitachi opted not to license IBM's z/Architecture for their quasi-MVS operating systems and hardware systems, and so MSP and VOS3, while still nominally supported by their vendors, maintain most of MVS's 1980s architectural limitations to the present day. Since z/OS still supports MVS-era applications and technologies— z/OS still contains most of MVS's code, albeit greatly enhanced and improved over decades of evolution—applications (and operational procedures) running on MSP and VOS3 can move to z/OS much more easily than to other operating systems.

== See also ==
- OS/360 and successors#Timeline
- Hercules, a S/370, S/390, and zSeries emulator capable of running MVS
- Utility programs supplied with MVS (and successor) operating systems
- BatchPipes is a batch job processing utility designed for the MVS/ESA operating system, and all later incarnations—OS/390 and z/OS.
