= IEFBR14 =

"Do nothing" program on IBM mainframes

IEFBR14 is a utility program that runs on mainframe computers from IBM. It runs in all mainframe environments derived from OS/360, including z/OS. It is a placeholder that returns the exit status zero, similar to the true command on UNIX-like systems.

== Purpose ==
=== Allocation (also called initiation) ===
On OS/360 and derived mainframe systems, most programs never specify files (usually called datasets) directly, but instead reference them indirectly through the Job Control Language (JCL) statements that invoke the programs. These data definition (or "DD") statements can include a "disposition" (DISP=...) parameter that indicates how the file is to be managed — whether a new file is to be created or an old one re-used; and whether the file should be deleted upon completion or retained; etc.

IEFBR14 was created because while DD statements can create or delete files easily, they cannot do so without a program to be run due to a certain peculiarity of the Job Management system, which always requires that the Initiator actually execute a program, even if that program is effectively a null statement. The program used in the JCL does not actually need to use the files to cause their creation or deletion — the DD DISP=... specification does all the work. Thus a very simple do-nothing program was needed to fill that role.

IEFBR14 can thus be used to create or delete a data set using JCL.

=== Deallocation (also called termination) ===
A secondary reason to run IEFBR14 was to unmount devices (usually tapes or disks) that had been left mounted from a previous job, perhaps because of an error in that job's JCL or because the job ended in error. In either event, the system operators would often need to unmount the devices, and a started task – DEALLOC – was often provided for this purpose.

Simply entering the command

S DEALLOC

at the system console would run the started task, which consisted of just one step. However, due to the design of Job Management, DEALLOC must actually exist in the system's procedure library, SYS1.PROCLIB, lest the start command fail.

Also, all such started tasks must be a single jobstep as the "Started Task Control" (STC) module within the Job Management component of the operating system only accepts single-step jobs, and it fails all multi-step jobs, without exception.

//STEP01    EXEC PGM=IEFBR14

=== Parsing and validation ===
At least on z/OS, branching off to execute another program would cause the calling program to be evaluated for syntax errors at that point.

== Naming ==
The "IEF" derives from a convention on mainframe computers that programs supplied by IBM were grouped together by function or creator and that each group shared a three-letter prefix. In OS/360, the first letter was almost always "I", and the programs produced by the Job Management group (including IEFBR14) all used the prefix "IEF". Other common prefixes included "IEB" for dataset utility programs, "IEH" for system utility programs, and "IEW" for program linkage and loading. Other major components were (and still are) "IEA" (Operating System Supervisor) and "IEC" (Input/Output Supervisor).

As explained below, "BR 14" was the essential function of the program, to simply return to the operating system. This portion of a program name was often mnemonic — for example, IEBUPDTE was the dataset utility (IEB) that applied updates (UPDTE) to source code files, and IEHINITT was the system utility (IEH) that initialized (INIT) magnetic tape labels (T).

As explained further in "Usage" below, the name "BR14" comes from the IBM assembler-language instruction "Branch (to the address in) Register 14", which by convention is used to "return from a subroutine". Most early users of OS/360 were familiar with IBM Assembler Language and would have recognized this at once.

== Usage ==
Example JCL would be :

//IEFBR14  JOB  ACCT,'DELETE DATASET',MSGCLASS=J,CLASS=A
//STEP0001 EXEC PGM=IEFBR14                       
//DELDD    DD DSN=xxxxx.yyyyy.zzzzz,
//            DISP=(MOD,DELETE,DELETE),UNIT=DASD

To create a Partitioned Data Set:

//TZZZ84R  JOB NOTIFY=&SYSUID,MSGCLASS=X                    
//STEP01    EXEC PGM=IEFBR14                                 
//DD1       DD DSN=TKOL084.DEMO,DISP=(NEW,CATLG,DELETE),           
//             DCB=(RECFM=FB,LRECL=80,BLKSIZE=80,DSORG=PO),  
//             SPACE=(TRK,(1,1,1),RLSE),                       
//             UNIT=SYSDA

== Implementation ==
IEFBR14 consisted initially of a single instruction a "Branch to Register" 14. The mnemonic used in the IBM Assembler was BR and hence the name: IEF BR 14. BR 14 is identically equivalent to BCR 15,14 (Branch Always [ mask = 15 = always ] to the address contained in general purpose register 14). BR is a pseudo instruction for BCR 15,[reg number]. The system assembler accepts many cases of such pseudo-instructions, as logical equivalents to the canonical System/360 instructions. The canonical instance of BR 14 is BCR 15,14.

The linkage convention for OS/360 and its descendants requires that a program be invoked with register 14 containing the address to return control to when complete, and register 15 containing the address at which the called program is loaded into memory; at completion, the program loads a return code in register 15, and then branches to the address contained in register 14. But, initially IEFBR14 was not coded with these characteristics in mind, as IEFBR14 was initially used as a dummy control section, one which simply returned to the caller, not as an executable module.

The original version of the program did not alter register 15 at all as its original application was as a placeholder in certain load modules which were generated during Sysgen (system generation), not as an executable program, per se. Since IEFBR14 was always invoked by the functional equivalent of the canonical BALR 14,15 instruction, the return code in register 15 was always non-zero. Later, a second instruction was to be added to clear the return code so that it would exit with a determinate status, namely zero. Initially, programmers were not using all properties of the Job Control Language, anyway, so an indeterminate return code was not a problem. However, subsequently programmers were indeed using these properties, so a determinate status became mandatory. This modification to IEFBR14 did not in any way impact its original use as a placeholder.

The machine code for the modified program is:

        SR    R15,R15  put zero completion code into register 15
        BR    R14      branch to the address in register 14 (which is actually an SVC 3 instruction in the Communications Vector Table)

The equivalent machine code, eliminating the BR for clarity, is:

        SR    R15,R15  put zero completion code into register 15
        SVC   3        issue EXIT SVC to terminate the jobstep

This makes perfect sense as the OS/360 Initiator initially "attaches" the job-step task using the ATTACH macro-instruction (SVC 42), and "unwinding" the effect of this ATTACH macro (it being a Type 2 SVC instruction) must be a complementary instruction, namely an EXIT macro (necessarily a Type 1 SVC instruction, SVC 3).

== See also ==
- true - the Unix-equivalent "do nothing" program
