= Access method =

APIs in IBM mainframe computer operating systems

An access method is a function of a mainframe operating system (Note: E.g., Input/Output Control System, File Control Processor (FCP) in RCA 3301 Realcom Operating System, GEFRC in GECOS, and the later Record Management Services (RMS) in DEC VAX/VMS (later OpenVMS.) that enables access to data on disk, tape or other external devices. Access methods were present in several mainframe operating systems since the late 1950s, under a variety of names; the name access method was introduced in 1963 in the IBM OS/360 operating system. Access methods provide an application programming interface (API) for programmers to transfer data to or from device, and could be compared to device drivers in non-mainframe operating systems, but typically provide a greater level of functionality.

== Purpose of access methods ==
System/360 and successor systems perform input/output using a special program for an I/O channel, a processor dedicated to control peripheral storage device access and data transfer to and from main memory. Channel programs are composed of channel command words (CCWs). Programming those is a complex task requiring detailed knowledge of the hardware characteristics. Channel programs are initiated by a START IO instruction issued by the operating system. This is usually front ended by the Execute Channel Program (EXCP) macro for application programmer convenience. EXCP issues an SVC (supervisor call instruction) that directs the operating system to issue the START IO on the application's behalf.

Access methods provide:

- Ease of programming - programmer would no longer deal with a specific device procedures, including error detection and recovery tactics in each and every program. A program designed to process a sequence of 80-character records would work no matter where the data are stored.
- Ease of hardware replacement - programmer would no longer alter a program when data should be migrated to newer model of storage device, provided it supports the same access methods.
- Ease shared data set access - an access method is a trusted program, that allows multiple programs to access the same file, while ensuring the basic data integrity and system security.
- Read-ahead - Queued access methods may start as many I/O operations as there are buffers available, anticipating application program requirements.

Unlike systems derived from Unix, where all files and devices are considered to be an unformatted stream of bytes, mainframes offer a variety of data options and formats, such as varying types and sizes of records, and different ways of accessing data, such as via record keys. Access methods provide programs a way of dealing with this complexity.

- Programs can read or write a record or block of data and wait until the input/output operation is complete (queued access methods) or allow the operation to be started and the program to continue to run, waiting for the completion at a later time (basic access methods).
- Programs can specify the size and number of buffers for a file. The same buffer or pool can be used for multiple files, allowing blocks of data to be read from one file and written to another without requiring data movement in memory.
- Programs can specify the type of error recovery to be used in case of input/output errors.

== Interfaces ==
In OS/360, the user must create and OPEN a Data Control Block (DCB), and CLOSE it when it is done. Many macro instructions refer directly to a DCB, but some refer to a control block that in turn refers to a DCB. For Execute Channel Program (EXCP), the user provides an Input/Output Block (IOB); for basic access methods the READ, WRITE and CHECK macro instructions refer to a Data Event Control Block (DECB).

In OS/VS, IBM introduced two new access methods, Virtual Storage Access Method (VSAM) and Virtual Telecommunications Access Method (VTAM). These use an Access Control Block (ACB) instead of a DCB, and most operations use a new control block, the Request Parameter List (RPL).

In OS/VS1 and MVS, the Job Entry Subsystem (JES) has an ACB/RPL interface for SYSIN and SYSOUT datasets, but BSAM and QSAM have a Compatibility Interface to support BSAM and QSAM.

== Storage access methods ==
Storage-oriented access methods in approximate chronological order:

- BDAM - Basic direct access method
- BSAM - Basic sequential access method
- QSAM - Queued sequential access method
- BPAM - Basic partitioned access method
- ISAM - Indexed sequential access method
- VSAM - Virtual storage access method, introduced with OS/VS
- OAM - Object access method, introduced in MVS/SP (1989)
- Distributed Data Management Architecture - access methods for distributed file access.

=== Basic versus queued ===
Both types of access deal with records of a data set. Basic access methods read or write one physical record – block – at a time. Queued methods support internal blocking of data and also often read-ahead scheme. Queued access methods generally provide better performance, while basic methods provide more flexibility.

=== Sequential versus direct ===
Sequential access assumes that records can be processed only sequentially, as opposed to direct (or random) access. Some devices, such as magnetic tape, naturally enforce sequential access, but it can be used as well on direct access storage devices (DASD), such as disk drives. In the latter case, a data set written with sequential access can be later processed in a direct manner.

== Networking access methods ==
Network-oriented access methods in approximate chronological order:

- BTAM - Basic telecommunications access method
- QTAM - Queued teleprocessing access method
- TCAM - Telecommunications access method
- VTAM - Virtual telecommunications access method, introduced with OS/VS
- TCP/IP for MVS - Transmission Control Protocol/Internet Protocol

== IMS ==
The IBM Information Management System (IMS) uses the term "access method" to refer to its methods for manipulating "segments in a database record". These are:

- Generalized Sequential Access Method (GSAM),
- Hierarchical Direct Access Method (HDAM),
- Hierarchical Indexed Direct Access Method (HIDAM),
- Hierarchical Indexed Sequential Access Method (HISAM),
- Hierarchical Sequential Access Method (HSAM),
- Overflow sequential access method (OSAM),
- Partitioned Hierarchical Direct Access Method (PHDAM),
- Partitioned Hierarchical Indexed Direct Access Method (PHIDAM),
- Partitioned Secondary Index (PSIMDEX),
- Simple Hierarchical Sequential Access Method (SHSAM), and
- Simple Hierarchical Indexed Sequential Access Method (SHISAM).

This is a different use of the term from the other access methods mentioned in this article.

== Modern implementations ==
In the z/OS operating system, two elements provide access methods:

- Data Facility Product
- Communications Server
