= Object access method =

Programming function available in z/OS

Object access method (OAM) is an access method under z/OS which is designed for the storage of large numbers of large files, such as images. It has a number of distinguishing features, e.g. compared to VSAM:

- OAM datasets do not have an internal record structure; they are accessed as binary data streams.
- OAM datasets are not directly cataloged. Rather, they are stored into OAM collections, with only the OAM collection being cataloged. The reason for this is to prevent the catalog from being overloaded with large numbers of (e.g. image) files.

OAM is used in conjunction with IBM Db2. An example use case for OAM would be storing medical images in a Db2 database running under z/OS.

== History ==
OAM was created in the 1980s "as a prototype product for an insurance company to replace microfiche." Initially OAM supported optical storage and magnetic disks. In the 1990s support for magnetic tape was added. In 2011 support was added for storage of objects in a z/OS unix file system—either zFS or NFS.

In the 1990s, Object Access Method was used by the Canadian Intellectual Property Office to store documents related to patent processing.
