= Special Real Time Operating System =

Special Real Time Operating System (SRTOS)
- Developer: IBM
- Working state: Discontinued
- Initial release: 1976; 49 years ago
- License: Proprietary

Special Real Time Operating System (SRTOS) is a discontinued IBM real time operating system, originally designed for use in the electricity industry, but later also applied in other areas of industrial process control. It formed part of the Realtime Plant Management System (RPMS) and Advanced Control System (ACS). Rather than a standalone operating system, it was designed as an extension to the OS/VS1 and OS/VS2 (later MVS) operating systems. It was also used in the paper industry. SRTOS was originally released in 1976, and though no longer supported as a program product, it is currently used as part of several ACS and RPMS installations worldwide.
