= Record Management Services =

File management processes in OpenVMS operating systems

Record Management Services (RMS) are procedures in the VMS, RSTS/E, RT-11 and RSX-11M operating systems that programs may call to process files and records within files. Its file formats and procedures are similar to of those in some IBM access methods (Note: Primarily: BDAM; BSAM; ISAM; QSAM; Virtual Storage Access Method (VSAM)) for several of its mainframe computer operating systems (Note: Primarily: DOS/360 and successors through z/VSE; OS/360 and successors through z/OS; TSS/360 and TSS/370) and by other vendors for file and record management. VMS RMS is an integral part of the system software; its procedures run in executive mode. (RMS was not initially integrated into RT-11 and RSTS/E, but was available as an added charge "layered product". It was later added to RSTS/E and was a part of its standard documentation set.)

RMS supports four record access methods:

- Sequential Access
- Relative Record Number Access
- Record File Address Access
- Indexed Access

RMS supports four record formats:

- Fixed length
- Variable length
- Variable record length with fixed-length control blocks
- Stream files (records separated by termination characters)
  - STREAM: Records terminated by CRLF
  - STREAM_CR: Records terminated by CR
  - STREAM_LF: Records terminated by LF

Digital provided the File Definition Language (FDL) which could be used to define the structure of an RMS file.
