= Sequential access memory =

In computing, sequential access memory (SAM) is a class of data storage devices that read stored data in a sequence. This is in contrast to random access memory (RAM) where data can be accessed in any order. Sequential access devices are usually a form of magnetic storage or optical storage.

While sequential access memory is read in sequence, arbitrary locations can still be accessed by "seeking" to the requested location. This operation, however, is often relatively inefficient (see seek time, rotational latency).

Magnetic sequential access memory is typically used for secondary storage in general-purpose computers due to their higher density at lower cost compared to RAM, as well as resistance to wear and non-volatility. Magnetic tape is a type of sequential access memory still in use; historically, drum memory has also been used.

== See also ==
- Sequential access
- Basic sequential access method (BSAM)
- Queued sequential access method (QSAM)
- Secondary storage
  - Hard disk drive
  - Solid-state drive
- Magnetic storage
- Magnetic tape
- Drum memory
- Locality of reference
- Streaming media
