= OS/VS =

OS/VS may refer to one of a number of IBM operating systems for System/370 and successors characterized by the use of virtual storage (VS):

- IBM OS/VS1, successor to MFT II, 1972-1984
- IBM OS/VS2, successor to MVT, including:
  - OS/VS2 version 1, also known as SVS (Single Virtual Storage), 1972-1974
  - OS/VS2 version 2, also known as MVS (Multiple Virtual Storage), 1974-1981

OS/VS1 had no follow-on systems. Successor operating systems of OS/VS2 dropped the "OS/VS" tag and became simply "MVS/SE", "MVS/SP", "MVS/XA", etc.

== See also ==
- MVS
- OS/360 and successors
