= ISAM =

Method for creating, maintaining, and manipulating computer files

Indexed Sequential Access Method (ISAM) is a method for creating, maintaining, and manipulating computer files of data so that records can be retrieved sequentially or randomly by one or more keys. Indexes of key fields are maintained to achieve fast retrieval of required file records in indexed files. IBM originally developed ISAM for mainframe computers, but implementations are available for most computer systems.

The term ISAM is used for several related concepts:

- The IBM ISAM product and the algorithm it employs.
- A database system where an application developer directly uses an application programming interface to search indexes in order to locate records in data files. In contrast, a relational database uses a query optimizer which automatically selects indexes.
- An indexing algorithm that allows both sequential and keyed access to data. Most databases use some variation of the B-tree for this purpose, although the original IBM ISAM and VSAM implementations did not do so.
- Most generally, any index for a database. Indexes are used by almost all databases.

== Organization ==
In an ISAM system, data is organized into records which are composed of fixed length fields, originally stored sequentially in key sequence. Secondary set(s) of records, known as indexes, contain pointers to the location of each record, allowing individual records to be retrieved without having to search the entire data set. This differs from the contemporaneous navigational databases, in which the pointers to other records were stored inside the records themselves. The key improvement in ISAM is that the indexes are small and can be searched quickly, possibly entirely in memory, thereby allowing the database to access only the records it needs. Additional modifications to the data do not require changes to other data, only the table and indexes in question.

When an ISAM file is created, index nodes are fixed, and their pointers do not change during inserts and deletes that occur later (only content of leaf nodes change afterwards). As a consequence of this, if inserts to some leaf node exceed the node's capacity, new records are stored in overflow chains. If there are many more inserts than deletions from a table, these overflow chains can gradually become very large, and this affects the time required for retrieval of a record.

Relational databases can easily be built on an ISAM framework with the addition of logic to maintain the validity of the links between the tables. Typically the field being used as the link, the foreign key, will be indexed for quick lookup. While this is slower than simply storing the pointer to the related data directly in the records, it also means that changes to the physical layout of the data do not require any updating of the pointers—the entry will still be valid.

ISAM is simple to understand and implement, as it primarily consists of direct access to a database file. The trade-off is that each client machine must manage its own connection to each file it accesses. This, in turn, leads to the possibility of conflicting inserts into those files, leading to an inconsistent database state. To prevent this, some ISAM implementations provide whole-file or individual record locking functionality. Locking multiple records runs the risk of deadlock unless a deadlock prevention scheme is strictly followed. The problems of locking, and deadlock are typically solved with the addition of a client–server framework which marshals client requests and maintains ordering. Full ACID transaction management systems are provided by some ISAM client–server implementations. These are the basic concepts behind a database management system (DBMS), which is a client layer over the underlying data store.

ISAM was replaced at IBM with a methodology called VSAM (virtual storage access method). Still later, IBM developed SQL/DS and then Db2 which IBM promotes as their primary database management system. VSAM is the physical access method used in Db2.

== OpenVMS ==
The OpenVMS operating system uses the Files-11 file system in conjunction with RMS (Record Management Services). RMS provides an additional layer between the application and the files on disk that provides a consistent method of data organization and access across multiple 3GL and 4GL languages. RMS provides four different methods of accessing data; sequential, relative record number access, record file address access, and indexed access.

The indexed access method of reading or writing data only provides the desired outcome if in fact the file is organized as an ISAM file with the appropriate, previously defined keys. Access to data via the previously defined key(s) is extremely fast. Multiple keys, overlapping keys and key compression within the hash tables are supported. A utility to define/redefine keys in existing files is provided. Records can be deleted, although "garbage collection" is done via a separate utility.

== Design considerations ==
IBM engineers designed the ISAM system to use a minimum amount of computer memory. The tradeoff was that the Input/Output channel, control unit, and disk were kept busier. An ISAM file consists of a collection of data records and two or three levels of index. The track index contains the highest key for each disk track on the cylinder it indexes. The cylinder index stores the highest key on a cylinder, and the disk address of the corresponding track index. An optional master index, usually used only for large files, contains the highest key on a cylinder index track and the disk address of that cylinder index. Once a file is loaded data records are not moved; inserted records are placed into a separate overflow area. To locate a record by key the indexes on disk are searched by a complex self-modifying channel program. This increased the busy time of the channel, control unit, and disk. With increased physical and virtual memory sizes in later systems this was seen as inefficient, and VSAM was developed to alter the tradeoff between memory usage and disk activity.

ISAM's use of self-modifying channel programs later caused difficulties for CP-67 support of OS/360, since CP-67 copied an entire channel program into fixed memory when the I/O operation was started and translated virtual addresses to real addresses.

== ISAM-style implementations ==
- Advantage Database Server database manager
- Berkeley DB
- Btrieve
- FairCom DB
- C-ISAM
- DataFlex proprietary database
- dBase and related products Clipper and FoxPro
- Digital Equipment Corporation Record Management Services
- Enscribe is the HP Tandem structured file access method
- Extensible Storage Engine
- Access Database Engine (ACE and formerly JET) used by Microsoft Access
- MySQL implements and extends ISAM as MyISAM
- Paradox
- pblIsam GPL implementation written in C
- Superbase database family
- dbm DBM and flat-file databases working in tandem

== See also ==
- Sequential access memory (SAM)
- Virtual storage access method (VSAM)
- Flat-file database
- NoSQL
- dbm
