= VSE (operating system) =

VSE^{n}
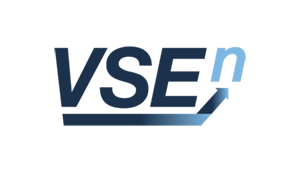
- Developer: 21st Century Software (previously IBM)
- OS family: DOS/360 and successors
- Working state: Current
- Source model: Closed source
- Latest release: 6.4 / October 15, 2025; 9 days ago
- Marketing target: IBM mainframe computers
- License: Proprietary
- Official website: 21cs.com/vsen/

VSE^{n} (Virtual Storage Extended) is an operating system for IBM mainframe computers, the latest one in the DOS/360 lineage, which originated in 1965. It is less common than z/OS and is mostly used on smaller machines.

DOS/VSE was introduced in 1979 as a successor to DOS/VS; in turn, DOS/VSE was succeeded by VSE/SP version 1 in 1983, and VSE/SP version 2 in 1985. In the late 1980s, there was a widespread perception among VSE customers that IBM was planning to discontinue VSE and migrate its customers to MVS instead, although IBM relented and agreed to continue to produce new versions of VSE. In February 2005, IBM announced z/VSE as successor to VSE/ESA 2.7, which was named to reflect the new System z branding for IBM's mainframe product line. In June 2021, 21st Century Software Inc announced that it had licensed the z/VSE source code from IBM with the intention of developing new versions of the operating system. As part of this transfer, z/VSE was renamed to VSE^{n}.

== Overview ==
DOS/360 originally used 24-bit addressing. As the underlying hardware evolved, VSE/ESA acquired 31-bit addressing capability.

IBM released z/VSE Version 4, which requires 64-bit z/Architecture hardware and can use 64-bit real mode addressing, in 2007. With z/VSE 5.1 (available since 2011) z/VSE introduced 64-bit virtual addressing and memory objects (chunks of virtual storage), that are allocated above 2 GB.

== User interfaces ==
=== Job Control Language (JCL) ===
A Job Control Language (JCL) that continues in the positional-parameter orientation of earlier DOS systems is VSE^{n}'s batch processing primary user interface. There is also another, special interface for system console operators.

=== Beyond batch ===
VSE^{n}, like z/OS systems, had traditionally provided 3270 terminal user interfaces. However, most VSE^{n} installations have at least begun to add Web browser access to VSE^{n} applications. VSE^{n}'s TCP/IP is a separately priced option for historic reasons, and is available in two different versions from two vendors. Both vendors provide a full function TCP/IP stack with applications, such as telnet and FTP. One TCP/IP stack provides IPv4 communication only, the other IPv4 and IPv6 communication. In addition to the commercially available TCP/IP stacks for VSE^{n}, IBM also provides the Linux Fastpath method which uses IUCV socket or Hipersockets connections to communicate with a Linux guest, also running on the mainframe.

Using this method the VSE^{n} system is able to fully exploit the native Linux TCP/IP stack.

IBM recommends that z/VSE customers run Linux on IBM Z alongside, on the same physical system, to provide another 64-bit application environment that can access and extend z/VSE applications and data via Hipersockets using a wide variety of middleware. CICS, one of the most popular enterprise transaction processing systems, is extremely popular among VSE^{n} users and now implements recent innovations such as Web services. Db2 is also available and popular.

== Device support ==
VSE^{n} can use ECKD, FBA and SCSI devices. Fibre Channel access to SCSI storage devices was initially available on z/VSE 3.1 on a limited basis (including on IBM's Enterprise Storage Server (ESS), IBM System Storage DS8000, DS6000 series), but the limitations disappeared with 4.2 (thus including IBM Storwize V7000, V5000, V3700 and V9000).

== See also ==
- z/OS
- z/TPF
- z/VM
- History of IBM mainframe operating systems#DOS/VS
- History of IBM mainframe operating systems
