= OS/VS2 =

Operating System/Virtual Storage 2 (OS/VS2) is the successor operating system to OS/360 MVT in the OS/360 family.

- SVS refers to OS/VS2 Release 1
- MVS refers to OS/VS2 Release 2 and later
