= Execute Channel Program =

Operating System low level I/O API

In IBM mainframe operating systems, Execute Channel Program (EXCP) is a macro generating a system call, implemented as a Supervisor Call instruction, for low-level device access, where the programmer is responsible for providing a channel program—a list of device-specific commands (CCWs)—to be executed by I/O channels, control units and devices. EXCP for OS/360 and successors is more specifically described in the OS System Programmer's Guide.; EXCP for DOS/360 and successors is more specifically described in DOS Supervisor and I/O Macros. This article mostly reflects OS/360 through z/OS; some details are different for TOS/360 and DOS/360 through z/VSE.

== Specifying datasets ==
Using EXCP, legacy devices and legacy datasets may be operated on with relatively high performance. EXCP devices are OPENed (that is, are made available to the application) by specifying the Data Control Block (DCB) for OS and the DTFPH for DOS.

== Specifying I/O operations ==
For OS/360 through z/OS, the program provides an Input/Output Block (IOB) to EXCP; if the program executes an EXCP to multiple IOBs, the system processes them in the order that they were requested. The IOB contains the address of an ECB, IOBECBPT, that the I/O supervisor will post when the operation completes.

For DASD the IOB includes a seek address, IOBSEEK, in the format MBBCCHHR, where M is the extent, BB is the bin for a data cell, CCHH is the cylinder and head, and R is the record number.

== Appendages ==
"An appendage is a programmer-written routine that provides additional control over I/O operations during channel program execution." A comprehensive list of appendages (exits in the EXCP context) allows authorized programs (Note: There are several type of authorization for the use of appendages: A program that is APF authorized, running in a system (0-7) key or in Supervisor Mode may use any appendage.; A program may use any appendage that is automatically selected by OPEN for the use of an access method.; A program may use any appendage that is defined at IPL time in IEAAPP00.) to override or augment many of the system security and data integrity checks. Most of these appendages are supported for compatibility with earlier instances of the OS, but the functions of several have been modified or extended for MVS. The appendages are specified in the DCB as the last two characters of the module name IGG019xx, where xx = WA to Z9, inclusive. These module names are reserved for installation-written appendages. Any other name of the form IGG019xx is reserved for use by IBM access methods. (Note: IGG = I/O Support component prefix; 019 = Open SVC sub-component; xx = sub-function) Appendages must reside in SYS1.SVCLIB (SYS1.LPALIB in SVS or later instances of the OS).

== Dataset integrity ==
Normally, when a program OPENs a DCB for EXCP, OPEN creates a Data Extent Block (DEB) containing each extent for the first volume of the associated dataset; however, for parallel mount OPEN creates a DEB containing all extents for all volumes. Each DEB is forward- and backward-chained to the DCB, and EXCP checks the chaining as a system security measure, as the DCB resides in unprotected user storage whereas the DEB resides in protected system storage, Subpool 253; in OS/VS1 and OS/VS2 EXCP uses DEBCHK to ensure that the DEB was created by OPEN. For DASD, EXCP checks that the seek address in the IOB is within one of the extents, and uses a Set File Mask to, e.g. indicate whether the extent is cylinder or track oriented, whether write is permitted; this prevents a seek out of the specified track (cylinder). If the programmer tries to read past the end of the track (cylinder), a unit check occurs and error recovery restarts the channel program with the next track (cylinder) of the current extent. If the operation goes beyond the end of the extent, EXCP calls the end of extent appendage, which may update the IOB and request either that EXCP reissue the request or that EXCP terminate it.

== Legacy datasets only ==
EXCP is sometimes confused with a direct access storage device access method, but it is not for direct access storage devices exclusively; rather, it is a general purpose low-level device access interface which supports any legacy device type and any legacy dataset organization. For accessing all device types and all dataset organizations, the more general privileged Start Input/Output interface (STARTIO) is available in MVS/370 and subsequent instances of the OS although it is not an officially supported interface.

== Simplified operations on direct access datasets ==
A variation of EXCP is Execute Direct Access Program (XDAP), which is used for accessing direct access storage only, and is provided for reading and updating existing direct access storage records. XDAP cannot be used to add records, but XDAP can be utilized along with BSAM or BPAM to effect record additions to such datasets, and several OS components utilize XDAP in this manner (the Linkage Editor, IEWL, in particular).

== Telecommunications device access ==
EXCP may also be used to access communications devices attached to IBM 2701, 2702 and 2703 communications controllers and IBM 370x or Amdahl 470x front-end processors (and their respective follow-ons) operating in emulator mode (EP) or partitioned emulator mode (PEP).

== Relationship to supervisor ==
EXCP's front-end is always in Task Control Block (TCB) mode, The normal mode for applications, as EXCP is a Type 1 SVC.

In MVS/370 and subsequent instances of the OS, the EXCP processor invokes STARTIO to schedule execution of the channel program. Although the EXCP processor's back-end is always in Service Request Block (Note: In OS/360, OS/VS1 and SVS there is no SRB mode and appendages run with interrupts disabled.) (SRB) mode, the back-end contains emulation code which allows the appendages developed for earlier, pre-MVS instances of the OS, specifically for EXCP, to function largely as before and thereby to appear to be in TCB mode, for which these appendages were originally designed. This distinction can complicate conversion of certain roll-your-own access methods and applications to MVS.

== Channel programs ==
System/360 channel programs are a sequence of commands which are executed by the channel and the I/O device. Channel programs can be located anywhere in main storage. The channel program is a sequence of Channel Command Words (CCWs), which may be executed sequentially unless a branch, called Transfer In Channel (TIC), is executed, or the channel returns a status modifier. Each CCW is a doubleword (eight bytes) as follows: (Note: Successorss add additional flags and formats System/370 with Dynamic Address Translation Adds the Channel Indirect Data Addressingfeature and the Indirect Data Address CCW flag. System/370-XA Adds format 1 CCWs with 31-bit addresses)

 bit     0      7 8                    31                                                  
        +--------+-----------------------+
        |Command | Data address          |
        +--------+-----------------------+
         32  36     40    47 48        63
        +------+---+--------+------------+
        |Flags |000|reserved| count      |
        +------+---+--------+------------+

Six commands are defined, in the low-order bits of the command field (0-7). The high-order four (or six) bits are modifiers ('M') for some commands, or are ignored. The commands are:

  0100 - Sense
  1000 - Transfer in Channel (TIC)
  1100 - Read backward
  --01 - Write
  --10 - Read
  --11 - Control

The data address (8-31) is the 24-bit address of a main storage buffer area to or from which the data is to be transferred.

The flag bits (32-36) are defined as follows:

Bit	ID	Name	Description
32	CD	Chain data	Use the storage area specified in the next CCW to continue this command
33	CC	Chain command	Execute the next sequential CCW when this command completes if CC or CD are not set, the channel program terminates after executing this command
34	SLI	Suppress length indication	Ignore incorrect length for this command
35	SKIP	Skip	Suppress data transfer for this command
36	PCI	Program controlled interruption	Generate an interrupt when this command starts executing

The count field (48-63) indicate the number of bytes to be transferred by this command.

All eight bits of commands that initiate I/O operations are passed to the device. "The modifier bits specify to the device how the command is to be executed." For example, for the IBM 2305 DASD the write command ('MMMMMM01'BX) may have the following values:

Bit value	Hexadecimal	Description
0001 1001	'19'X	Write home address
0001 0101	'15'X	Write record 0
0001 0001	'11'X	Erase
0001 1101	'1D'X	Write count, key, and data
0000 0001	'01'X	Write special count, key, and data
0000 0101	'05'X	Write data
0000 1101	'0D'X	Write key and data
