= IBM System/360 architecture =

Model independent architecture for the S/360 line of mainframe computers

System/360
- Designer: IBM
- Bits: 32-bit
- Introduced: April 7, 1964; 62 years ago
- Design: CISC
- Type: Register-Register; Register-Memory; Memory-Memory
- Encoding: Variable (2, 4 or 6 bytes long)
- Branching: Condition code, indexing, counting
- Endianness: Big
- Page size: N/A, except for 360/67
- Open: Yes

Registers
- General-purpose: 16× 32-bit
- Floating-point: 4× 64-bit

The IBM System/360 architecture is the model independent architecture for the entire S/360 line of mainframe computers, including but not limited to the instruction set architecture. The elements of the architecture are documented in the IBM System/360 Principles of Operation and the IBM System/360 I/O Interface Channel to Control Unit Original Equipment Manufacturers' Information manuals.

== Features ==
IBM S/360 registers
General Registers 0-15
Two's complement value	
0	31
Floating Point Registers 0, 2, 4 and 6
S	Biased exponent		Mantissa	
0	1	7	8	31
Mantissa (continued)				
32				63
S/360 PSW
Chan. Mask						I O	E X	Key		A	M	W	P	Interruption Code	
0	1	2		4	5	6	7	8	11	12	13	14	15	16	31
ILC		CC		Program; Mask				Instruction Address							
32	33	34	35	36			39	40							63
S/360 PSW abbreviations: Bits / Field / Meaning; 0-5 / / Channel Masks for channels 0-5; 6 / IO / I/O Mask for channels > 5; 7 / EX / External Mask; 8-11 / Key / PSW key; 12 / A / ASCII mode for decimal arithmetic; 13 / M / Machine-check mask; 14 / W / Wait state; 15 / P / Problem state; 16-31 / IC / Interruption Code; 32-33 / ILC / Instruction-Length Code; 34-35 / CC / Condition Code; 36-39 / PM / Program Mask: Bit / Meaning; 36 / Fixed-point overflow; 37 / Decimal overflow; 38 / Exponent underflow; 39 / Significance; 40-63 / IA / Instruction Address
- IBM documentation numbers the bits from high order to low order; the most significant (leftmost) bit is designated as bit number 0.

The System/360 architecture provides the following features:

- 16 32-bit general-purpose registers
- 4 64-bit floating-point registers
- 64-bit processor status register (PSW), which includes a 24-bit instruction address
- 24-bit (16 MB) byte-addressable memory space
- Big-endian byte/word order
- A standard instruction set, including fixed-point binary arithmetic and logical instructions, present on all System/360 models (except the Model 20, see below).
  - A commercial instruction set, adding decimal arithmetic instructions, is optional on some models, as is a scientific instruction set, which adds floating-point instructions. The universal instruction set includes all of the above plus the storage protection instructions and is standard for some models.
  - The Model 44 provides a few unique instructions for data acquisition and real-time processing and is missing the storage-to-storage instructions. However, IBM offered a 'Commercial Instruction Set" feature that ran in bump storage and simulated the missing instructions.
  - The Model 20 offers a stripped-down version of the standard instruction set, limited to eight general registers with halfword (16-bit) instructions only, plus the commercial instruction set, and unique instructions for input/output.
  - The Model 67 includes some instructions to handle 32-bit addresses and "dynamic address translation", with additional privileged instructions to provide virtual memory.

== Memory ==
Memory (storage) in System/360 is addressed in terms of 8-bit bytes. Various instructions operate on larger units called halfword (2 bytes), fullword (4 bytes), doubleword (8 bytes), quad word (16 bytes) and 2048 byte storage block, specifying the leftmost (lowest address) of the unit. Within a halfword, fullword, doubleword or quadword, low numbered bytes are more significant than high numbered bytes; this is sometimes referred to as big-endian. Many uses for these units require aligning them on the corresponding boundaries. Within this article the unqualified term word refers to a fullword.

The original architecture of System/360 provided for up to 2^{24} = 16,777,216 bytes of memory. The later Model 67 extended the architecture to allow up to 2^{32} = 4,294,967,296 (Note: Twice the size of the later System/370) bytes of virtual memory.

== Addressing ==
System/360 uses truncated addressing similar to that of the UNIVAC III. That means that instructions do not contain complete addresses, but rather specify a base register and a positive offset from the addresses in the base registers. In the case of System/360 the base address is contained in one of 15 (Note: A specification of general register 0 yield a base address of zero rather than the register content.) general registers. In some instructions, for example shifts, the same computations are performed for 32-bit quantities that are not addresses.

== Data formats ==
The S/360 architecture defines formats for characters, integers, decimal integers and hexadecimal floating point numbers. Character and integer instructions are mandatory, but decimal and floating point instructions are part of the Decimal arithmetic and Floating-point arithmetic features.

- Characters are stored as 8-bit bytes.
- Integers are stored as two's complement binary halfword or fullword values.
- Packed decimal numbers are stored as 1 to 16 8-bit bytes containing an odd number of decimal digits followed by a 4-bit sign. Sign values of hexadecimal A, C, E, and F are positive and sign values of hexadecimal B and D are negative. Digit values of hexadecimal A-F and sign values of 0-9 are invalid, but the PACK and UNPK instructions do not test for validity.
- Zoned decimal numbers are stored as 1 to 16 8-bit bytes, each containing a zone in bits 0-3 and a digit in bits 4-7. The zone of the rightmost byte is interpreted as a sign.
- Floating point numbers are only stored as fullword or doubleword values on older models. On the 360/85 and 360/195 there are also extended precision floating point numbers stored as quadwords. For all three formats, bit 0 is a sign and bits 0-7 are a characteristic (exponent, biased by 64). Bits 8-31 (8-63) are a hexadecimal fraction. For extended precision, the low order doubleword has its own sign and characteristic, which are ignored on input and generated on output.

== Instruction formats ==
Instructions in the S/360 are two, four or six bytes in length, with the opcode in byte 0. Instructions have one of the following formats:

- RR (two bytes). Generally byte 1 specifies two 4-bit register numbers, but in some cases, e.g., SVC, byte 1 is a single 8-bit immediate field.
- RS (four bytes). Byte 1 specifies two register numbers; bytes 2-3 specify a base and displacement.
- RX (four bytes). Bits 0-3 of byte 1 specify either a register number or a modifier; bits 4-7 of byte 1 specify the number of the general register to be used as an index; bytes 2-3 specify a base and displacement.
- SI (four bytes). Byte 1 specifies an immediate field; bytes 2-3 specify a base and displacement.
- SS (six bytes). Byte 1 specifies two 4-bit length fields or one 8-bit length field; bytes 2-3 and 4-5 each specify a base and displacement. The encoding of the length fields is length-1.

Instructions must be on a two-byte boundary in memory; hence the low-order bit of the instruction address is always 0.

== Program Status Word (PSW) ==
The Program Status Word (PSW) contains a variety of controls for the currently operating program. The 64-bit PSW describes (among other things) the address of the current instruction being executed, condition code and interrupt masks.

PSW format
Bits	Contents	Explanation
0-7	System Mask	bits 0-5: enable channels 0-5, bit 6: enable all remaining channels, (Note: On a processor that complies with the S/360 architecture, the highest channel number is 6. Eleven bits are sufficient to identify the cuu, and seven bits are sufficient to provide masking of I/O interruptions. However, on a 360/67-2 with two 2846 channel controllers, channels are numbered 0-6 and 8-14; similarly, the 360/195 had an extended channel feature but numbered the channels 0 through 13. I/O interruptions for Channel Controller 1 on the 360/67-2 were masked using control registers, and the 360/195 used bit 7 (Channel 6) of the System Mask as a summary mask bit for channels 6 and up. Interruptions from More than Seven Channels describes the summary masking for additional channels, but other text in Principles of Operation still refers to a limit of 7 channels. Standard software supported channels 0-F.) bit 7: enable External interruptions (timer, interrupt key, and external signal
8-11	Protection key	CPU protection key to compare against storage protection keys
12	ASCII mode	enable ASCII mode for packed decimal instructions, never used by IBM software (Note: Because the design of the S/360 occurred simultaneously with the development of ASCII, IBM's ASCII support did not match the standard that was ultimately adopted.)
13	Machine checks	enable Machine check interruptions
14	Wait State	processor is halted, an interruption, if enabled, will cause the processor to resume executing instructions
15	Problem state	enable to prevent the use of instructions reserved for supervisor state
16-31	Interruption Code	code to indicate the type of interruption, inserted when the PSW is stored, during IPLoad, this is the address of the device from which the program was loaded
32-33	Instruction Length Code	length in halfwords or 0 if unavailable
34-35	Condition Code	see individual instructions for encoding
36-39	Program Mask	bit 36: enable fixed-point overflow, bit 37: decimal overflow, bit 38: exponent underflow, bit 39: significance
40-63	Instruction Address	address of next instruction, except for a program interruptions with ILC 0

Load Program Status Word (LPSW) is a privileged instruction that loads the Program Status Word (PSW), including the program mode, protection key, and the address of the next instruction to be executed. LPSW is often used to return from an interruption by loading the old PSW that is associated with the interruption class. One privileged instruction (SSM) and one unprivileged instruction (SPM) are available for manipulating subsets of the PSW without causing an interruption or loading a PSW. (Note: Successors to S/360 added additional instructions.)

== Interruption system ==
The architecture defines 5 classes of interruption. An interruption is a mechanism for automatically changing the program state; it is used for both synchronous (Note: The S/360 literature does not use the terms fault or trap) and asynchronous events.

Interruption class	Old PSW		New PSW		Priority
Interruption class	hex	dec	hex	dec	Priority
Input/Output	38	56	78	120	4
Program	28	40	68	104	2
Supervisor Call	20	32	60	96	2
External	18	24	58	88	3
Machine Check	30	48	70	112	1

There are two storage fields assigned to each class of interruption on the S/360; an old PSW double-word and a new PSW double-word. The processor stores the PSW, with an interruption code inserted, into the old PSW location and then loads the PSW from the new PSW location. This generally replaces the instruction address, thereby effecting a branch, and (optionally) sets and/or resets other fields within the PSW, thereby effecting a mode change.

The S/360 architecture defines a priority to each interruption class, but it is only relevant when two interruptions occur simultaneously; an interruption routine can be interrupted by any other enabled interruption, including another occurrence of the initial interruption. For this reason, it is normal practice to specify all of the mask bits, with the exception of machine-check mask bit, as 0 for the "first-level" interruption handlers. "Second-level" interruption handlers are generally designed for stacked interruptions (multiple occurrences of interruptions of the same interruption class).

=== Input/Output interruption ===
An I/O interruption occurs at the completion of a channel program, after fetching a CCW with the PCI bit set and also for asynchronous events detected by the device, control unit or channel, e.g., completion of a mechanical movement. The system stores the device address into the interruption code and stores channel status into the CSW at location 64 ('40'X).

=== Program interruption ===
A Program interruption occurs when an instruction encounters one (Note: On the 360/91, 360/95 and 360/195 a Program interruption may occur for multiple imprecise exceptions. The ILC in the Program Old PSW is 0, bits 26-31 are 0 and bits 16-27 are a mask indicating which exceptions occurred; there is no provision for reporting multiple occurrences of the same exception. Reporting of multiple imprecise exceptions is not part of the S/360 architecture.) of 15 (Note: There are 17 possible exceptions on the 360/67, but page exception and segment exception are not part of the S/360 architecture; similarly, interruption code 18 ('0012'X) on a 360/65 multiprocessor is not part of the S/360 architecture.) exceptions; however, if the Program Mask bit corresponding to an exception is 0 then there is no interruption for that exception. On 360/65, 360/67 and 360/85 the Protection Exception and Addressing Exception interruptions can be imprecise, in which case they store an Instruction Length Code of 0. The Interruption code may be any of

Interruption codes for Program interruptions old PSW bits 26-31
hex bits 26-31	Dec	Exception
0	0	Imprecise interruption on 360/91, 360/95 or 360/195 Old PSW bits for multiple imprecise interruption codes: bit / Exception; 16 / Protection; 17 / Addressing; 18 / Specification (Note: The Specification bit is not used for imprecise interruptions on the 360/195); 19 / Data; 20 / Fixed-Point Overflow; 21 / Fixed-Point Divide; 22 / Exponent Overflow; 23 / Exponent Underflow; 24 / Significance; 25 / Floating-Point Divide; 26 / Decimal Overflow (Note: Not Used on 360/91); 27 / Decimal Divide
1	1	Operation
2	2	Privileged operation
3	3	Execute
4	4	Protection
5	5	Addressing
6	6	Specification
7	7	Data
8	8	Fixed-point overflow
9	9	Fixed-point divide
A	10	Decimal overflow
B	11	Decimal divide
C	12	Exponent overflow
D	13	Exponent underflow
E	14	Significance
F	15	Floating-point divide
10	16	Segment Translation
11	17	Page Translation
12	18	SSM Exception

- An operation exception is recognized when a program attempts to execute an instruction with an opcode that the computer does not implement. In particular, an operation exception is recognized when a program is written for an optional feature, e.g., floating point, that is not installed.
- A privileged operation exception is recognized when a program attempts to execute a privileged instruction when the problem state bit in the PSW is 1.
- An execute exception is recognized when the operand of an EXECUTE instruction (EX) is another EXECUTE instruction.
- A protection exception is recognized when a program attempts to store into a location whose storage protect key does not match (Note: A PSW key of 0 matches any storage key.) the PSW key, or to fetch from a fetch protected location whose storage protect key does not match the PSW key.
- An addressing exception is recognized when a program attempts to access a storage location that is not currently available. This normally occurs with an address beyond the capacity of the machine, but it may also occur on machines that allow blocks of storage to be taken offline.
- A specification exception is recognized when an instruction has a length or register field with values not permitted by the operation, or when it has an operand address that does not satisfy the alignment requirements of the opcode, e.g., a LH instruction with an odd operand address on a machine without the byte alignment feature.
- A data exception is recognized when a decimal instruction specifies invalid operands, e.g., invalid data, invalid overlap.
- A fixed-point overflow exception is recognized when significant bits are lost in a fixed point arithmetic or shift instruction, other than divide.
- A fixed-point divide exception is recognized when significant bits are lost in a fixed point divide or Convert to Binary instruction.
- A decimal overflow exception is recognized when significant digits are lost in a decimal arithmetic instruction, other than divide.
- A decimal divide exception is recognized when significant bits are lost in a decimal divide instruction. The destination is not altered.
- An exponent overflow exception is recognized when the characteristic in a floating-point arithmetic operation exceeds 127 and the fraction is not zero.
- An exponent underflow exception is recognized when the characteristic in a floating-point arithmetic operation is negative and the fraction is not zero.
- A significance exception is recognized when the fraction in a floating-point add or subtract operation is zero.
- A floating-point divide exception is recognized when the fraction in the divisor of a floating-point divide operation is zero.

OS/360 ABEND codes for hardware exceptions are 'S0Cx', where 'x' is the hexadecimal value of the code above. For example Abend S0C7 is a trap caused by a data exception.

=== Supervisor Call interruption ===
A Supervisor Call interruption occurs as the result of a Supervisor Call instruction; the system stores bits 8-15 of the SVC instruction as the Interruption Code.

=== External interruption ===
An External (Note: Even though a timer expiration is an internal event, it causes an External interruption and for this reason, this interruption is usually referred to as a timer/external interruption.) interruption occurs as the result of certain asynchronous events. Bits 16-24 of the External Old PSW are set to 0 and one or more of bits 24-31 is set to 1

Interruption codes for External interruptions
PSW bit	Type of external interruption
24	Timer
25	Interrupt key
26	External signal 2 Malfunction alert on 360/65 in Multisystem mode
27	External signal 3 System Call on 360/65 in Multisystem mode
28	External signal 4
29	External signal 5
30	External signal 6
31	External signal 7

=== Machine Check interruption ===
A Machine Check interruption occurs to report unusual conditions associated with the channel or CPU that cannot be reported by another class of interruption. The most important class of conditions causing a Machine Check is a hardware error such as a parity error found in registers or storage, but some models may use it to report less serious conditions. Both the interruption code and the data stored in the scanout area at '80'x (128 decimal) are model dependent.

== Input/Output ==
This article describes I/O from the CPU perspective. It does not discuss the channel cable or connectors, which have a separate article; there is a summary elsewhere and details can be found in the IBM literature and in FIPS PUB 60-2.

I/O is carried out by a conceptually separate processor called a channel. Channels have their own instruction set, and access memory independently of the program running on the CPU. On the smaller models (through 360/50) a single microcode engine runs both the CPU program and the channel program. On the larger models the channels are in separate cabinets and have their own interfaces to memory. A channel may contain multiple subchannels, each containing the status of an individual channel program. A subchannel associated with multiple devices that cannot concurrently have channel programs is referred to as shared; a subchannel representing a single device is referred to as unshared.

There are three types of channels on the S/360:

- A byte multiplexer channel is capable of executing multiple CCWs concurrently; it is normally used to attach slow devices such as card readers and telecommunications lines. A byte multiplexer channel could have a number of selector subchannels, each with only a single subchannel, which behave like low-speed selector channels.
- A selector channel has only a single subchannel, and hence is only capable of executing one channel command at a time. It is normally used to attach fast devices that are not capable of exploiting a block multiplexer channel to suspend the connection, such as magnetic tape drives.
- A block multiplexer channel is capable of concurrently running multiple channel programs, but only one at a time can be active. The control unit can request suspension at the end of a channel command and can later request resumption. This is intended for devices in which there is a mechanical delay after completion of data transfer, e.g., for seeks on moving-head DASD. The block multiplexer channel was a late addition to the System/360 architecture; early machines had only byte multiplexer channels and selector channels. The block multiplexer channel is an optional feature only on the models 85 and 195. The block multiplexor channel is also available on the later System/370 computers.

Conceptually peripheral equipment is attached to a S/360 through control units, which in turn are attached through channels. However, the architecture does not require that control units be physically distinct, and in practice they are sometimes integrated with the devices that they control. Similarly, the architecture does not require the channels to be physically distinct from the processor, and the smaller S/360 models (through 360/50) have integrated channels that steal cycles from the processor.

Peripheral devices are addressed with 16-bit (Note: Because of the limits on the channel number, S/360 and early S/370 software only used 12 bits to store device addresses.) addresses., referred to as cua or cuu; this article will use the term cuu. The high 8 bits identify a channel, numbered from 0 to 6, while the low 8 bits identify a device on that channel. A device may have multiple cuu addresses.

Control units are assigned an address "capture" range. For example, a CU might be assigned range 20-2F or 40-7F. The purpose of this is to assist with the connection and prioritization of multiple control units to a channel. For example, a channel might have three disk control units at 20-2F, 50-5F, and 80-8F. Not all of the captured addresses need to have an assigned physical device. Each control unit is also marked as High or Low priority on the channel.

Device selection progresses from the channel to each control unit in the order they are physically attached to their channel. At the end of the chain the selection process continues in reverse back towards the channel. If the selection returns to the channel then no control unit accepted the command and SIO returns Condition Code 3. Control units marked as High Priority check the outbound CUU to be within their range. If so, then the I/O is processed. If not, then the selection is passed to the next outbound CU. Control units marked as Low Priority check for inbound (returning) CUU to be within their range. If so, then the I/O is processed. If not, then the selection is passed to the next inbound CU (or the channel). The connection of three controls unit to a channel might be physically -A-B-C and, if all are marked as High then the priority would be ABC. If all are marked low then the priority would be CBA. If B was marked High and AC low then the order would be BCA. Extending this line of reasoning then the first of N controllers would be priority 1 (High) or 2N-1 (Low), the second priority 2 or 2N-2, the third priority 3 or 2N-3, etc. The last physically attached would always be priority N.

There are three storage fields reserved for I/O; a double word I/O old PSW, a doubleword I/O new PSW and a fullword Channel Address Word (CAW). Performing an I/O normally requires the following:

- initializing the CAW with the storage key and the address of the first CCW
- issuing a Start I/O (SIO) instruction that specifies the cuu for the operation
- waiting (Note: But continuing with unrelated work.) for an I/O interruption
- handling any unusual conditions indicated in the Channel Status Word (CSW)

A channel program consists of a sequence of Channel Control Words (CCWs) chained together (see below.) Normally the channel fetches CCWs from consecutive doublewords, but a control unit can direct the channel to skip a CCW and a Transfer In Channel (TIC) CCW can direct the channel to start fetching CCWs from a new location.

There are several defined ways for a channel command to complete. Some of these allow the channel to continue fetching CCWs, while others terminate the channel program. In general, if the CCW does not have the chain-command bit set and is not a TIC, then the channel will terminate the I/O operation and cause an I/O interruption when the command completes. Certain status bits from the control unit suppress chaining.

The most common ways for a command to complete are for the count to be exhausted when chain-data is not set and for the control unit to signal that no more data transfers should be made. If Suppress-Length-Indication (SLI) is not set and one of those occurs without the other, chaining is not allowed. The most common situations that suppress chaining are unit-exception and unit-check. However, the combination of unit-check and status-modifier does not suppress chaining; rather, it causes the channel to do a command retry, reprocessing the same CCW.

In addition to the interruption signal sent to the CPU when an I/O operation is complete, a channel can also send a Program-Controlled interruption (PCI) to the CPU while the channel program is running, without terminating the operation, and a delayed device-end interruption after the I/O completion interruption.

=== Channel status ===
These conditions are detected by the channel and indicated in the CSW.

- Program-controlled interruption indicates that the channel has fetched a CCW with the PCI bit set. The channel continues processing; this interruption simply informs the CPU of the channel's progress. An example of the use of Program-controlled interruption is in the "Program Fetch" function of Contents Supervision, whereby the control program is notified that a Control/Relocation Record has been read. To ensure that this record has been completely read into main storage, a "disabled bit spin", one of the few which remains in the control program, is initiated. Satisfaction of the spin indicates that the Control/Relocation Record is completely in main storage and the immediately preceding Text Record may be relocated. After relocation, a NOP CCW is changed to a TIC and the channel program continues. In this way, an entire load module may be read and relocated while utilizing only one EXCP, and possibly only one revolution of the disk drive. PCI also has applications in teleprocessing access method buffer management.
- Incorrect length indicates that the data transfer for a command completed before the Count was exhausted. This indication is suppressed if the Suppress-Length-Indication bit in the CCW is set.
- Program check indicates one of the following errors
  - Nonzero bits where zeros are required
  - An invalid data or CCW address
  - The CAW or a TIC refers to a TIC
- Protection check indicates that the protection key in the CAW is non-zero and does not match the storage protection key.
- Channel data check indicates a parity error during a data transfer.
- Channel control check indicates a channel malfunction other than Channel data check or Interface control check.
- Interface control check indicates an invalid signal in the channel to control unit interface.
- Chaining check indicates lost data during data chaining.

=== Unit status ===
These conditions are presented to the channel by the control unit or device. In some cases they are handled by the channel and in other cases they are indicated in the CSW. There is no distinction between conditions detected by the control unit and conditions detected by the device.

- Attention indicates an unusual condition not associated with an ongoing channel program. It often indicates some sort of operator action like requesting input, in which case the CPU would respond by issuing a read-type command, most often a sense command (04h) from which additional information could be deduced. Attention is a special condition, and requires specific operating system support, and for which the operating system has a special attention table (Note: The OS uses the attention index in a Unit Control Block (UCB) as an index into the attention table.) with a necessarily limited number of entries.
- Status modifier (SM) indicates one of three unusual conditions
  - A Test I/O instruction was issued to a device that does not support it.
  - A Busy status refers to the control unit rather than to the device.
  - A device has detected a condition that requires skipping a CCW. A CCW with a command for which Status Modifier is possible will normally specify command chaining, in which case the SM is processed by the channel and does not cause an interruption.

A typical channel program where SM occurs is

    ...
    Search Id Equal
    TIC           *-8
    Read Data

where the TIC causes the channel to refetch the search until the device indicates a successful search by raising SM.

- Control unit end indicates that a previous control unit busy status has been cleared.
- Busy indicates that a device (SM=0) or a control unit (SM=1) is busy.
- Channel end indicates that the device has completed the data transfer for a channel command. There may also be an Incorrect length indication if the Count field of the CCW is exhausted, depending on the value of the Suppress-Length-Indication bit.
- Device end indicates that the device has completed an operation and is ready to accept another. DE may be signalled concurrently with CE or may be delayed.
- Unit check indicates that the device or control unit has detected an unusual condition and that details may be obtained by issuing a Sense command.
- Unit exception indicates that the device has detected an unusual condition, e.g., end of file.

=== Channel Address Word ===
The fullword Channel Address Word (CAW) contains a 4-bit storage protection key and a 24-bit address of the channel program to be started.

=== Channel Command Word ===
A Channel Command Word is a doubleword containing the following:

- an 8-bit channel Command Code
- a 24-bit address
- a 5-bit flag field
- an unsigned halfword Count field

==== CCW Command codes ====
The low order 2 or 4 bits determine the six types of operations that the channel performs;. The encoding is

CCW Command codes
bits	Command
**** 0000	Invalid in a CCW, simulated by the processor's Test I/O (TIO) instruction
MMMM 0100	Sense
**** 1000	Transfer in Channel (TIC)
MMMM 1100	Read Backward
MMMM MM01	Write
MMMM MM10	Read
MMMM MM11	Control

The meaning of the high order six or four bits, the modifier bits, M in the table above, depends upon the type of I/O device attached, see e.g., DASD CKD CCWs. All eight bits are sent to and interpreted in the associated control unit (or its functional equivalent).

Control is used to cause a state change in a device or control unit, often associated with mechanical motion, e.g., rewind, seek.

Sense is used to read data describing the status of the device. The most important case is that when a command terminates with unit check, the specific cause can only be determined by doing a Sense and examining the data returned. A Sense command with the modifier bits all zero is always valid.

A noteworthy deviation from the architecture is that DASD use Sense command codes for Reserve and Release, instead of using Control.

==== CCW flags ====
The flags in a CCW affect how it executes and terminates.

CCW flags
bit		flag	effect
32	CD	Chain-Data	Continue operation using the storage area defined by the next CCW.
33	CC	Chain-Command	Continue with the Command in the next CCW.
34	SLI (Note: Also known as Suppress Incorrect Length Indication (SILI))	Suppress-Length-Indication	Continue channel program after count mis-match.
35	SKIP	Skip	Do not read from or write into storage.
36	PCI	Program-Controlled-Interruption	Request interruption when fetching CCW.

=== Channel Status Word ===
The Channel Status Word (CSW) provides data associated with an I/O interruption.

CSW format
bits	field
0-3	Key
4-7	0000
8-31	Command Address
32-47	Status
32-39	Unit Status Conditions Detected by the device or control unit
32	Attention
33	Status modifier
34	Control unit end
35	Busy
36	Channel end
37	Device end
38	Unit check
39	Unit exception
40-47	Channel Status Conditions Detected by the channel.
40	Program-controlled interruption
41	Incorrect length
42	Program check
43	Protection check
44	Channel data check
45	Channel control check
46	Interface control check
47	Chaining check
48-63	Count

- The Protection Key field contains the protect key from the CAW at the time that the I/O operation was initiated for I/O complete or PCI interruptions.
- The Command Address field contains the address+8 of the last CCW fetched for an I/O complete or PCI interruption. However, there are 9 exceptions
- The Status field contains one byte of Channel status bits, indicating conditions detected by the channel and one byte of Unit status bits, indicating conditions detected by the I/O unit There is no distinction between conditions detected by the control unit and conditions detected by the device.
- The Residual Count is a half word that gives the number of bytes in the area described by the CCW that have not been transferred to or from the channel The difference between the count in the CCW and the residual count gives the number of bytes transferred.

=== I/O instructions ===
The S/360 has four I/O instructions: Start I/O (SIO), Test I/O (TIO), Halt I/O (HIO) and Test Channel (TCH). All four are privileged and thus will cause a privileged operation program interruption if used in problem state. The B_{1} (base) and D_{1} (displacement) fields are used to calculate the cuu (channel and device number); bits 8-15 of the instructions are unused and should be zero for compatibility with the S/370.

==== Start I/O (SIO) ====
SIO attempts to start the channel program pointed to by the CAW, using the storage protection key in the CAW.

==== Test I/O (TIO) ====
TIO tests the status of a channel and device. It may also store a CSW, in which case it completes with condition code 1.

==== Halt I/O (HIO) ====
HIO attempt to terminate an active channel program. It may also store a CSW, in which case it completes with condition code 1.

==== Test Channel (TCH) ====
TCH tests the status of a channel. It does not affect the status of an active channel program and does not store a CSW,

== Operator controls ==
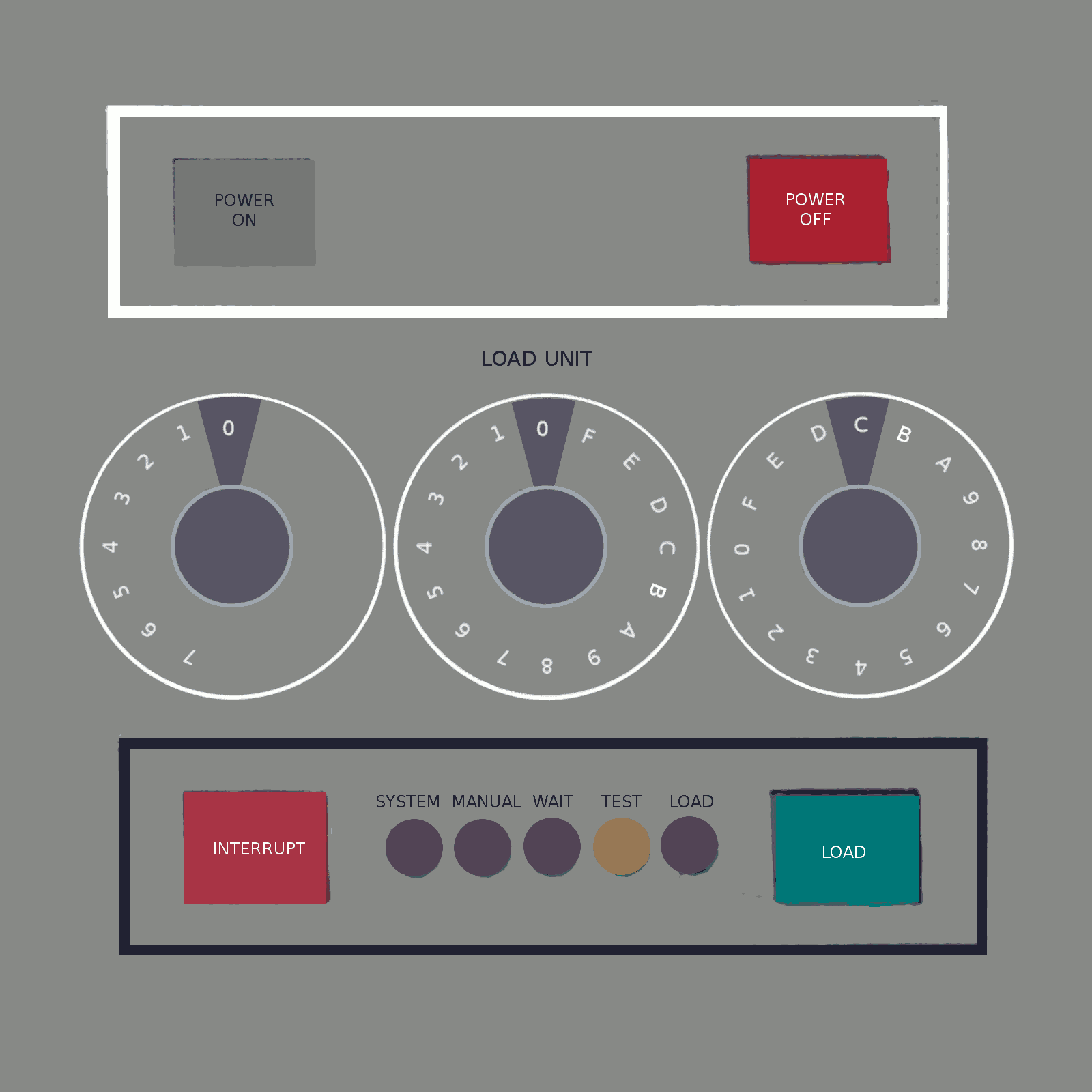
operator controls

The architecture of System/360 specified the existence of several common functions, but did not specify their means of implementation. This allowed IBM to use different physical means, e.g., dial, keyboard, pushbutton, roller, image or text on a CRT, for selecting the functions and values on different processors. Any reference to key or switch should be read as applying to, e.g., a light-pen selection, an equivalent keyboard sequence.

- System Reset sends a reset signal on every I/O channel and clears the processor state; all pending interruptions are cancelled. System Reset is not guaranteed to correct parity errors in general registers, floating point registers or storage. System Reset does not reset the state of shared I/O devices.
- Initial Program Load (IPL) is a process for loading a program when there isn't a loader available in storage, usually because the machine was just powered on or to load an alternative operating system. This process is sometimes known as Booting.

As part of the IPL facility the operator has a means of specifying a 12-bit device address, typically with three dials as shown in the operator controls drawing. When the operator (Note: Or an equivalent automated facility.) selects the Load function, the system performs a System Reset, sends a Read IPL (Note: Read with all modifier bits zero) channel command to the selected device in order to read 24 bytes into locations 0-23 and causes the channel to begin fetching CCWs at location 8; the effect is as if the channel had fetched a CCW from location 0 with a length of 24, an address of 0 and the flags containing Command Chaining + Suppress Length Indication. At the completion of the operation, the system stores the I/O address in the halfword at location 2 and loads the PSW from location 0.

Initial program loading is typically done from a tape, a card reader, or a disk drive. Generally, the operating system was loaded from a disk drive; IPL from tape or cards was used only for diagnostics or for installing an operating system on a new computer.

- Emergency pull switch (Emergency power off, EPO) sends an EPO signal to every I/O channel, then turns off power to the processor complex. Because EPO bypasses the normal sequencing of power down, damage can result, and the EPO control has a mechanical latch to ensure that a customer engineer inspects the equipment before attempting to power it back on.
- Power on powers up all components of the processor complex and performs a system reset.
- Power off initiates an orderly power-off sequence. Although the contents of storage are preserved, the associated storage keys may be lost.
- The Interrupt key causes an external interruption with bit 25 set in the External Old PSW.
- The Wait light indicates that the PSW has bit 14 (wait) set; the processor is temporarily halted but resumes operation when an interruption condition occurs.
- The Manual light indicates that the CPU is in a stopped state.
- The System light indicates that a meter is running, either due to CPU activity or due to I/O channel activity.
- The Test light indicates that certain operator controls are active, when certain facilities, e.g., INSTRUCTION STEP, have been used by a Diagnose instruction or when abnormal thermal conditions exist. The details are model dependent.
- The Load light is turned on by IPL and external start. It is turned off by loading the PSW from location 0 at the completion of the load process.
- The Load unit controls provide the rightmost 11 (Note: There is an inconsistency, in that Interruptions from More than Seven Channels allows for more channels.) bits of the device from which to perform an IPL.
- The Load Key starts the IPL sequence.
- The Prefix Select Key Switch selects whether IPL will use the primary prefix or the alternative prefix.
- The System-Reset Key initiates a System Reset.
- The Stop Key puts the CPU in a stopped state; channel programs continue running and interruption conditions remain pending.
- The Rate Switch determines the mode in which the processor fetches instructions. Two modes are defined by the architecture:
  - PROCESS
  - INSTRUCTION STEP
- The Start Key initiates instruction fetching in accordance with the setting of the Rate Switch.
- The Storage-Select Switch determines the type of resource accessed by the Store Key and Display Key. Three selections are defined by the architecture:
  - Main storage
  - General registers
  - Floating-point registers
- The Address Switches specify the address or register number for the Store Key, Display Key and, on some models, the Set IC Key..
- The Data Switches specify the data for the Store Key and, on some models, the Set IC Key.
- The Store Key stores the value in the Data Switches as specified by the Storage-Select Switch and the Address Switches.
- The Display Key displays the value specified by the Storage-Select Switch and the Address Switches.
- The Set IC= sets the instruction address portion of the PSW from the Data Switches or the Address Switches, depending on the model.
- The Address-Compare Switches select the mode of comparison and what is compared. Stop on instruction address compare is present on all models, but stop on data address compare is only present on some models.
- The Alternate-Prefix Light is on when the prefix trigger is in the alternate state.

== Optional features ==
=== Byte-aligned operands ===
On some models, e.g., the S/360-85, the alignment requirements for some problem-state instructions were relaxed. There is no mechanism to turn off this feature, and programs depending on receiving a program check type 6 (alignment) on those instructions must be modified.

=== Decimal arithmetic ===
The decimal arithmetic feature provides instructions that operate on packed decimal data. A packed decimal number has 1-31 decimal digits followed by a 4-bit sign. All of the decimal arithmetic instructions except PACK and UNPACK generate a Data exception if a digit is not in the range 0-9 or a sign is not in the range A-F.

=== Direct Control ===
The Direct Control feature provides six external signal lines and an 8-bit data path to/from storage.

=== Floating-point arithmetic ===
The floating-point arithmetic feature provides 4 64-bit floating point registers and instructions to operate on 32 and 64 bit hexadecimal floating point numbers. The 360/85 and 360/195 also support 128 bit extended precision floating point numbers.

=== Interval timer ===
If the interval timer feature is installed, the processor decrements the word at location 80 ('50'X) at regular intervals; the architecture does not specify the interval but does require that value subtracted make it appear as though 1 were subtracted from bit 23 300 times per second. The smaller models decremented at the same frequency (50 Hz or 60 Hz) as the AC power supply, but larger models had a high resolution timer feature. The processor causes an External interruption when the timer goes to zero.

=== Multi-system operation ===
Multi-system operation is a set of features to support multi-processor systems, e.g., Direct Control, direct address relocation (prefixing).

=== Storage protection ===
If the storage protection feature is installed, then there is a 4-bit storage key associated with every 2,048-byte block of storage and that key is checked when storing into any address in that block by either a CPU or an I/O channel. A CPU or channel key of 0 disables the check; a nonzero CPU or channel key allows data to be stored only in a block with the matching key.

Storage Protection was used to prevent a defective application from writing over storage belonging to the operating system or another application. This permitted testing to be performed along with production. Because the key was only four bits in length, the maximum number of different applications that could be run simultaneously was 15.

An additional option available on some models was fetch protection. It allowed the operating system to specify that blocks were protected from fetching as well as from storing.

== Deviations and extensions ==
The System/360 Model 20 is radically different and should not be considered to be a S/360.

The System/360 Model 44 is missing certain instructions, but a feature allowed the missing instructions to be simulated in hidden memory thus allowing the use of standard S/360 operating systems and applications.

Some models have features that extended the architecture, e.g., emulation instructions, paging, and some models make minor deviations from the architecture. Examples include:

- The multisystem feature on the S/360-65 which modifies the behavior of the direct control feature and of the Set System Mask (SSM) instruction.
- The System/360 Model 67-2 had similar, but incompatible, changes.

Some deviations served as prototypes for features of the S/370 architecture.

== See also ==
- Memory protection key
