= Input/Output Supervisor Block =

An Input/Output Supervisor Block (IOSB) is a data structure used by the Start Input/Output (STARTIO) interface of MVS/370 and successor IBM mainframe operating systems. It is used to communicate information regarding an I/O request among the requestor of an I/O service, the I/O supervisor, error-recovery procedures, the write-to-operator (WTO) subsystem, statistics-update modules, and among the components of the I/O supervisor.

An IOSB is always paired with a Service Request Block (SRB). The SRB schedules processor activity, as required, on any available processor in connection with the I/O request, although the I/O operation itself may have been initiated on another processor. This distinction allowed, for example, effective use of so-called "attached processors" (processors with no connected I/O devices), which were common in the early days of MVS/370, and in installations with requirements for more data processing power (e.g., processor accesses, also called CPU-bound applications), but perhaps not more I/O processing power (e.g., disk or tape accesses, also called I/O-bound applications).
