= Thread control block =

Thread Control Block (TCB) is a data structure in an operating system kernel that contains thread-specific information needed to manage the thread. The TCB is "the manifestation of a thread in an operating system."

Each thread has a thread control block. An operating system keeps track of the thread control blocks in kernel memory.

An example of information contained within a TCB is:

- Thread Identifier: Unique id (tid) is assigned to every new thread
- Stack pointer: Points to thread's stack in the process
- Program counter: Points to the current program instruction of the thread
- State of the thread (running, ready, waiting, start, done)
- Thread's register values
- Pointer to the Process control block (PCB) of the process that the thread lives on

The Thread Control Block acts as a library of information about the threads in a system. Specific information is stored in the thread control block highlighting important information about each process.

== See also ==
- Parallel Thread Execution
- Process control block (PCB)
- Thread Environment Block (TEB)
- Thread-local storage (TLS)
