= Cedar Cliff High School =

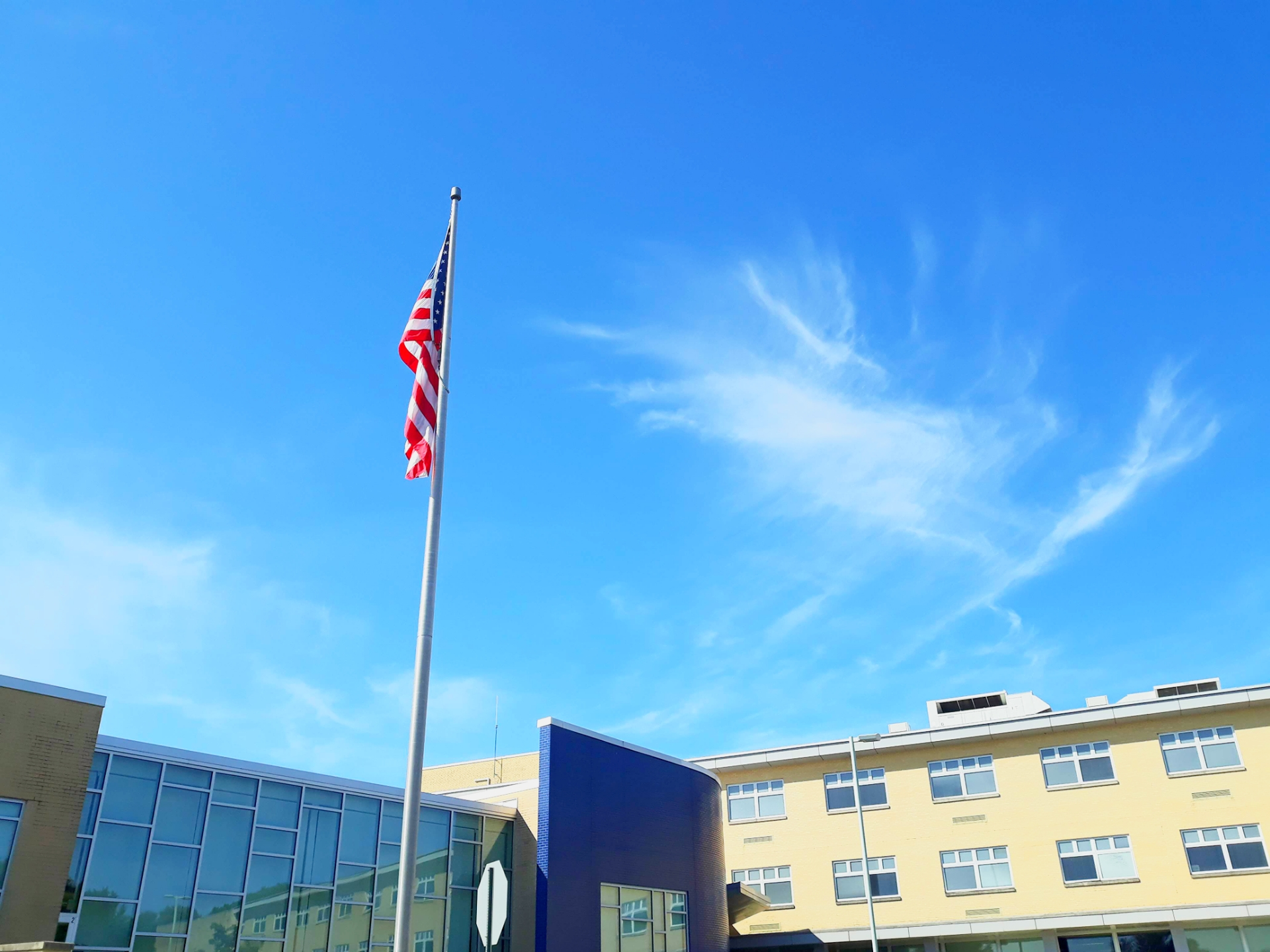

Location
- 1301 Carlisle Rd; Camp Hill address, Pennsylvania; United States; 40.2296°N 76.8962°W

Information
- Other name: Cedar Cliff Senior High School
- Type: High School
- Established: 1959
- School district: West Shore School District
- Principal: Jennifer Post
- Teaching staff: 81.85 (FTE)
- Grades: 9–12
- Enrollment: 1,333 (2024–2025)
- Student to teacher ratio: 16.29
- Colors: Navy, gold, and silver
- Athletics: Pennsylvania Interscholastic Athletic Association
- Mascot: Colts
- Team name: Cedar Cliff Colts
- Newspaper: The Cedar Cliff Post
- Yearbook: Cedar Log
- Website: www.wssd.k12.pa.us/CedarCliff.aspx

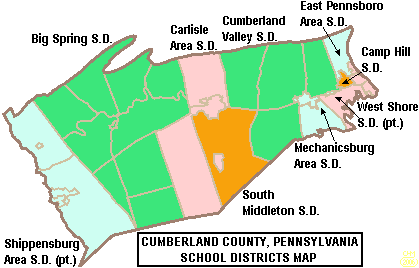
West Shore School District region in Cumberland County

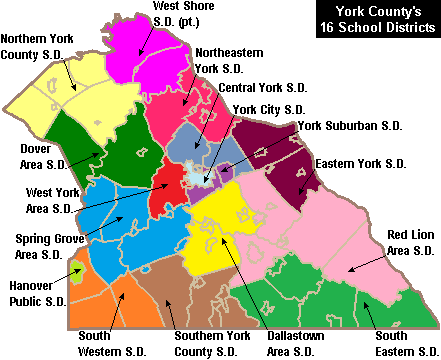
West Shore School District region in York County

Cedar Cliff High School is located in Lower Allen Township, Cumberland County, Pennsylvania, United States, with a Camp Hill post office address.

The older of the two high schools in the West Shore School District, it was formed in 1959 with the merger of West Shore High School and New Cumberland High School. The entire West Shore School District attended Cedar Cliff until fall 1965, when Red Land High School opened. In 2019, the school had 1,290 students enrolled. In 2011, the school had 95 teachers yielding a student teach ratio of 14:1. According to a 2011 report by the Pennsylvania Department of Education, eight teachers are considered "Non-Highly Qualified" under No Child Left Behind law. The Cedar Cliff mascot is The Colt, and the school colors are navy blue, silver and gold. The Pennsylvania Department of Education has set the tuition for non-resident and charter school students at $8,969.40.

== History ==
Starting in the late 19th century it was common for the wealthy of Harrisburg to buy rural plots of land to vacation for the summer. In 1903, congressman Marlin Olmsted of Harrisburg purchased 69 acres as a summer farm residence named "Cedar Cliff". Following his passing, his widow remarried Vance C. McCormick, whose family maintained Cedar Cliff until 1954 when it was sold to prominent architect William Lynch Murray of Shipoke, Harrisburg.

Cedar Cliff High school was formed from the merger of West Shore High School (Closed Lemoyne Middle School) and New Cumberland High School (New Cumberland Middle School) in 1959. West Shore's colors, navy blue and silver, would merge with New Cumberland's navy blue and gold, to make Cedar Cliff's colors, navy blue, gold, and silver. The West Shore Joint School System would become the West Shore School District in 1966, the year that Red Land High School opened.

=== Dedication ===
Cedar Cliff High School's dedication was held on October 25, 1959. Cedar Cliff was operated by the West Shore Joint Senior High School Board. This board was a jointure of the school districts of Lemoyne, Lower Allen Township, New Cumberland, Redland, and Wormleysburg. The board presented Cedar Cliff Senior High School as the "Fulfillment of a dream for better educational opportunities for the youth of its service area." Cedar Cliff opened with administrators Supervising Principal Raymond A. Wort, assistant John A. Johnson, and assistant Louis S. Edwards along with 60 faculty members.

== Demographics ==
The demographic breakdown of the 1,333 students enrolled for 2024-2025 was:

- Male - 718 (54%)
- Female - 615 (46%)
- Native American/Alaskan - 1
- Asian - 54 (4%)
- Black - 125 (9%)
- Hispanic - 207 (16%)
- White - 868 (65%)
- Multiracial - 77 (6%)

529 students were eligible for free lunch and 28 for reduced-cost lunch. For 2019-2020, Cedar Cliff was a Title I school.

Note: Details may not add to totals.

== Notable alumni ==
- Kyle Brady – former tight end for the New York Jets, Jacksonville Jaguars, and New England Patriots, class of 1990
- Adam Breneman – former tight end for the Penn State Nittany Lions and UMass Minutemen football, now an announcer, class of 2013
- Patrick Fabian – American actor of film, stage and television, including Better Call Saul, class of 1983
- Edson Hendricks – an IBM computer scientist and developer of RSCS or VNET, class of 1963
- Rudi Protrudi – lead vocalist and frontman of The Fuzztones, class of 1970
- Mike Regan – former U.S. Marshal and current Pennsylvania State Senator, class of 1980
- Rikki Rockett – drummer of rock band Poison, class of 1980
- Michele Smith (actress) – former host of American Thunder, class of 1980
- Coy Wire – former linebacker for the Atlanta Falcons and Buffalo Bills, class of 1997
