= Edson Hendricks =

American computer scientist

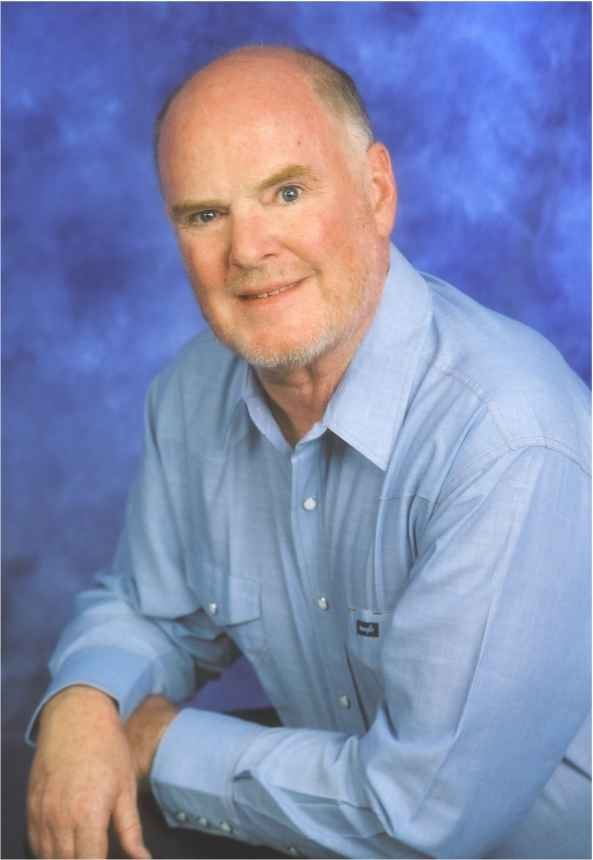
- Born: Edson C. Hendricks; May 22, 1945 (age 81); Lemoyne, Pennsylvania, U.S.
- Education: Massachusetts Institute of Technology
- Scientific career
- Fields: Computer science

Edson C. Hendricks (May 22, 1945 - August 29, 2020) was an American computer scientist who worked at IBM, where he developed RSCS (later known as VNET), a fundamental software that powered the world’s largest network (or network of networks) prior to the Internet. RSCS directly influenced both Internet development and user acceptance of networking between independently managed organizations. Within IBM, the resulting network later became known as VNET and grew to 4000 nodes. In the academic community, VNET formed the base for BITNET, which extended to 500 organizations and 3,000 nodes. VNET was also the networking design underpinning EARN in Europe, and NETNORTH in Canada.

== Biography ==
Hendricks was born on May 22, 1945, in Lemoyne, Pennsylvania. He attended Herman Avenue Elementary School, Washington Heights Elementary School (both in Lemoyne, Pennsylvania, Lemoyne Middle School, and Cedar Cliff High School in Camp Hill, Pennsylvania, all in the West Shore School District. He graduated from the Massachusetts Institute of Technology in June, 1967 with a bachelor's degree in Electrical Engineering. He began graduate studies with networking pioneer J. C. R. Licklider, but, impressed by the groundbreaking computer work being done nearby at the IBM Cambridge Scientific Center (CSC), he joined their staff in March 1968.

Hendricks left the CSC in July 1977, joining the IBM San Jose Research Laboratory. In 1983, unable to convince IBM management to support his networking ideas for joining VNET and TCP/IP, he left IBM and worked as an independent consultant for several years. He then joined the Linkabit Corporation, and later became one of the very earliest employees at ViaSat in Carlsbad, California. He now lives in San Diego, California.

Hendricks died on August 29, 2020, in Cardiff-by-the-Sea, California.

== Technological innovations ==
As an undergraduate, Hendricks visited the MIT student employment center, where he was offered the position of computer operator, running an IBM System/360 model 65 computer. Hendricks was rapidly promoted to systems programmer. When IBM added a 2250 video display to the 360/65, Hendricks looked for a project to learn how to program it. Upstairs in the same building, Steve Russell had created “Spacewar!,” the first computer game, using a DEC PDP-1 computer. Hendricks wrote his own game, also named “Spacewar!,” which was the first computer video game to run on an IBM Computer. For several years, MIT used Hendricks version of “Spacewar!” at their Annual Open House, making it possibly the first video game ever to be seen (and played) by the general public.

At IBM, Hendricks worked with the team that had developed the world’s first virtual machine operating systems, CP/CMS. A key problem with this new software architecture was finding a way to expand the functions of the system without significantly increasing the size of the hypervisor (control program). Hendricks developed the concept of a service virtual machine, implemented in a simple communications system named CPREMOTE.

In 1971, Norman Rasmussen, founder and manager of IBM’s Cambridge Scientific Center, asked Hendricks to find a way for the CSC machine to communicate with machines at IBM’s other Scientific Centers. Hendricks and Tim Hartmann, of the IBM Technology Data Center in Poughkeepsie, NY, produced RSCS, which went into operation within IBM in 1973. RSCS was later renamed and released to IBM customers as the VM/370 Networking PRPQ in 1975. The importance of this subsystem as a component of VM is described by Robert Creasy.

Meanwhile, in the fall of 1974, IBM announced Systems Network Architecture (SNA) as its official communications strategy. SNA was incompatible with VNET and with many of the networking ideas being developed for what would be called the Internet, particularly with TCP/IP. Hendricks and others lobbied vigorously within IBM for a change in direction, but were rebuffed.

In June 1975, MIT Professor Jerry Saltzer accompanied Hendricks to DARPA, where Hendricks described his innovations to the principal scientist, Dr. Vinton Cerf. Later that year in September 15–19 of 75, Cerf and Hendricks were the only two delegates from the United States, to attend a workshop on Data Communications at the International Institute for Applied Systems Analysis, 2361 Laxenburg Austria where again, Hendricks spoke publicly about his innovative design which paved the way to the Internet as we know it today.

In 1977, Hendricks received an IBM "Outstanding Achievement Award," for the "VM/370 Networking PRPQ," and the IBM internal network.

In the late 1970s, VNET was much larger than the ARPAnet/Internet as measured in the number of computers connected. In 1981, when the ARPAnet began converting to TCP/IP, there were about 250 ARPAnet nodes and 1000 VNET nodes. Hendricks and others had proposed the interconnection of the two networks. Turing Award winner Jim Gray, then at IBM, thought the VNET/ARPAnet linkup would be "absolutely wonderful -- with no downside except security risks, which were containable." IBM management declined.

RSCS was sold as a product by IBM until May, 2008, when it was repackaged as an optional feature with the z/VM operating system.
