= IBM Remote Access Computing =

Remote Access Computing (RAX)
- Developer: IBM
- OS family: RACS
- Working state: Discontinued
- Initial release: 1966; 60 years ago
- Marketing target: IBM mainframe computers
- Available in: English
- Supported platforms: IBM System/360
- Preceded by: RACS
- Succeeded by: MUSIC

IBM Remote Access Computing (RAX) is a discontinued early time-sharing system for IBM System/360 introduced in 1966. RAX was based on an earlier system, RACS. developed jointly by IBM and Lockheed Aircraft in Marietta, Georgia in 1965. The system influenced a number of other timesharing systems including MCGILL-RAX from McGill University, McGill's MUSIC, and Reactive Terminal Service (RTS) from ITT Data Services. In the 1970s Boston University used RAX as the basis of its VPS system, which ran as a guest operating system running on VM/370.

== Hardware ==
RAX was available from IBM as program number 360A-CX-17X, and runs on System/360 Model 30 and above.As announced, it runs on systems with as little as 64 KB of main storage, and supports a mix of up to 63 IBM 1050 typewriter terminals and IBM 2260 display terminals. The languages supported are BASIC, FORTRAN IV, and IBM Basic assembly language. (Note: RTS also supported COBOL.) In a minimal system with 64 KB memory, user programs can be up to 32 KB, with larger programs allowed on larger systems.

== Users ==
In 1968 RAX was used by the United States Department of Agriculture for their Washington Data Processing Center. It was used in a number of colleges, universities, and corporations, including McGill, Boston University, St. Andrew's in Scotland, The University of Rhode Island, and Bell Aerosystems.
