= VPS =

VPS may refer to:

== Science and technology ==
- Virtual private server, a method of partitioning a physical server computer into multiple servers
- VPS/VM, a computer operating system
- Kodak Vericolor III, Type S film
- Video programming system, a standard for video recorders in Germany
- Ventriculo-peritoneal shunt, a neurosurgical method used to treat hydrocephalus

== Organizations ==
- Vaasan Palloseura, a Finnish football club
- Vanguardia Popular Socialista, a nationalist Chilean political party
- Vietnamese Professionals Society, an international organization
- Volkspartei der Schweiz, a defunct Swiss neo-Nazi political party

== Other uses ==
- V. P. Singh, (1931–2008), former prime minister of India
- Victim Personal Statement, in UK law
- Destin–Fort Walton Beach Airport (IATA code), Florida
- In the novel Brave New World, it stands for Violent Passion Surrogate
