= Virtual Machine Communication Facility =

Feature of 1976 operation system

The IBM Virtual Machine Communication Facility (VMCF) is a feature of the VM/370 operating system introduced in Release 3 in 1976. It "provides a method of communication and data transfer between virtual machines operating under the same VM/370 system."

VMCF uses paravirtualization through the diagnose instruction VMCF SEND function to send data, in blocks of up to 2048 bytes, from one virtual machine to another. The receiving virtual machine accesses the data thru the diagnose RECEIVE function. It provides a simpler interface and greater performance than the prior use of virtual channel-to-channel adapters for the same purpose.

VMCF was superseded by the Inter User Communication Vehicle (IUCV), introduced in 1980 with VM/SP.
