= IBM VNET =

Corporate computer network

VNET is an international computer networking system deployed in the mid-1970s and still in current, though greatly diminished, use. It was developed inside IBM and provided the main email and file-transfer backbone for the company throughout the 1980s and 1990s. Through it, a number of protocols were developed to deliver email amongst time sharing computers over alternative transmission systems.

VNET was first deployed as a private host to host network among CP/67 and VM/370 mainframes beginning before 1975. It was based on RSCS, a virtual machine–based communications program and an inter machine protocol developed in IBM's Advanced Systems Development Division's Remote Service System (RSS) prototype which produced some of the technology in the IBM Tivoli product. At that time, RSCS used the Binary Synchronous Communications (BSC) protocol, not Systems Network Architecture (SNA), to support file to file transfer among virtual machine users. (Note: IBM later introduced SNA support for RSCS as part of its Network Job Entry (NJE) suite. After IBM introduced TCP/IP support for NJE, customer use shifted away from SNA.) The first several nodes included Scientific Centers and Poughkeepsie, New York lab sites.

RSCS-compatible communications code was subsequently developed for MVT/HASP, MVT/ASP and MVS mainframe operating systems. By September 1979, the network had grown to include 285 mainframe nodes in Europe, Asia, and North America, with eventual growth to over 3,500 nodes by January 1990. Unlike the Internet, VNET switched files among mainframes using a store and forward technique. Many of the early connections operated over dial-up phone lines at speeds of 1200 to 2400 bits per second. The addition of a 19.2 kbit/s trans-Atlantic satellite circuit in late 1977 was considered a major step forward.

End users typically sent files between 100 and 100,000 bytes in length. The user could expect delivery within one minute to several hours. File delivery was acknowledged on a hop by hop basis but there was no end to end delivery confirmation. However, by the late 1970s an email application was developed that provided delivery confirmation as well as message archiving. What began as a research activity among engineers and scientists became, by 1980, a valuable business asset for many organizations within IBM.

The first widely disruptive computer worm, "Christmas Tree EXEC" in December 1987, originated on BITNET and spread to this network.
