= Channel-to-channel adapter =

In IBM mainframe technology, a channel-to-channel adapter (CTCA) is a device that connects two input/output channels on (usually) two separate computer systems.

The adapter allows one computer system to be treated as an input/output device by another. It is used "to link the processing units in a loosely coupled multiprocessing system.

Virtual channel-to-channel adapters (VCTCA) are often used to communicate between two virtual machines in the z/VM operating system. The Virtual Machine Communication Facility (VMCF), and later Inter User Communication Vehicle (IUCV) are now often used in place of VCTCAs because they provide a simpler interface and improved performance.

On IBM Z processors, the functionality of a CTCA is implemented by connecting two ESCON channels or two FICON channels either point-to-point or via a director.
