= BITNET =

Academic computer network

BITNET was a co-operative university computer network in the United States founded in 1981 by Ira Fuchs at the City University of New York (CUNY) and Greydon Freeman at Yale University. The first network link was between CUNY and Yale.

== Background ==
The name BITNET originally meant "Because It's There Network", but it eventually came to mean "Because It's Time Network".

A college or university wishing to join BITNET was required to lease a data circuit from a site to an existing BITNET node, buy modems for each end of the data circuit, sending one to the connecting point site, and allow other institutions to connect to its site free of charge.

In the early 1980s, the National Science Foundation (NSF) had several initiatives running to help spread the benefits of networking. One of these efforts was called CSNET, and it linked together several computer science departments across the country using TCP/IP. Another was a network of regional computer networks that linked up universities in different parts of the country. In 1981, universities came together to form BITNET, which allowed thousands of new users to experience innovations such as email and file transfers for the first time. All of these new networks showed the possibilities of computer networks and helped stoke demand for a robust nationwide network like NSFNET.

BITNET’s first electronic magazine, VM/COM, began as a University of Maine newsletter and circulated broadly in early 1984. Two email newsletters that began as Bitnet newsletters in the fall of 1987 are known to still be transmitting. They are the Electronic Air and SCUP Email News (formerly SCUP Bitnet News).

IBM gave BITNET a $2 million grant over three years during the mid-1980s. BITNET's eligibility requirements limited exchange with commercial entities, including IBM itself, which made technical assistance and bug fixes difficult. This became a particular problem when trying to communicate on heterogeneous networks with graphical workstation vendors such as Silicon Graphics.

== Technical details ==
BITNET, with Remote Spooling Communications Subsystem (RSCS) and the Network Job Entry (NJE) network protocol, was used for the huge IBM internal network known as VNET. BITNET links originally ran at 9600 bit/s. The BITNET protocols were eventually ported to non-IBM mainframe operating systems, and became particularly widely implemented under VAX/VMS, in addition to DECnet.

BITNET featured email and LISTSERV software, but predated the World Wide Web, the common use of FTP, and Gopher. Gateways for the lists made them available on Usenet. BITNET also supported interactive transmission of files and messages to other users. A gateway service called TRICKLE enabled users to request files from Internet FTP servers in 64 Kb UUencoded chunks. The Interchat Relay Network, popularly known as Bitnet Relay, was the network's instant messaging feature.

BITNET differed from the Internet in that it was a point-to-point "store and forward" network. That is, email messages and files were transmitted in their entirety from one server to the next until reaching their destination. From this perspective, BITNET was more like UUCPNET.

== Extent ==
As of April 1988 BITNET connected about 400 universities and 1200 computers. At its zenith around 1991, BITNET extended to almost 500 organizations and 3,000 nodes, all educational institutions. It spanned North America (in Canada it was known as NetNorth), Europe (as EARN), Israel (as ISRAEARN), India (VIDYANET) and some Persian Gulf states (as GulfNet). BITNET was also very popular in other parts of the world, especially in South America, where about 200 nodes were implemented and heavily used in the late 1980s and early 1990s. Part of the South African inter-university academic network, initially known as UNINET, and later TENET (Tertiary Education Network) was implemented using BITNET protocols in the late 1980s, with a TCP/IP gateway to the Internet via Rhodes University. With the rapid growth of TCP/IP systems and the Internet in the early 1990s, and the rapid abandonment of the base IBM mainframe platform for academic purposes, BITNET's popularity and use diminished quickly.

== Legacy ==
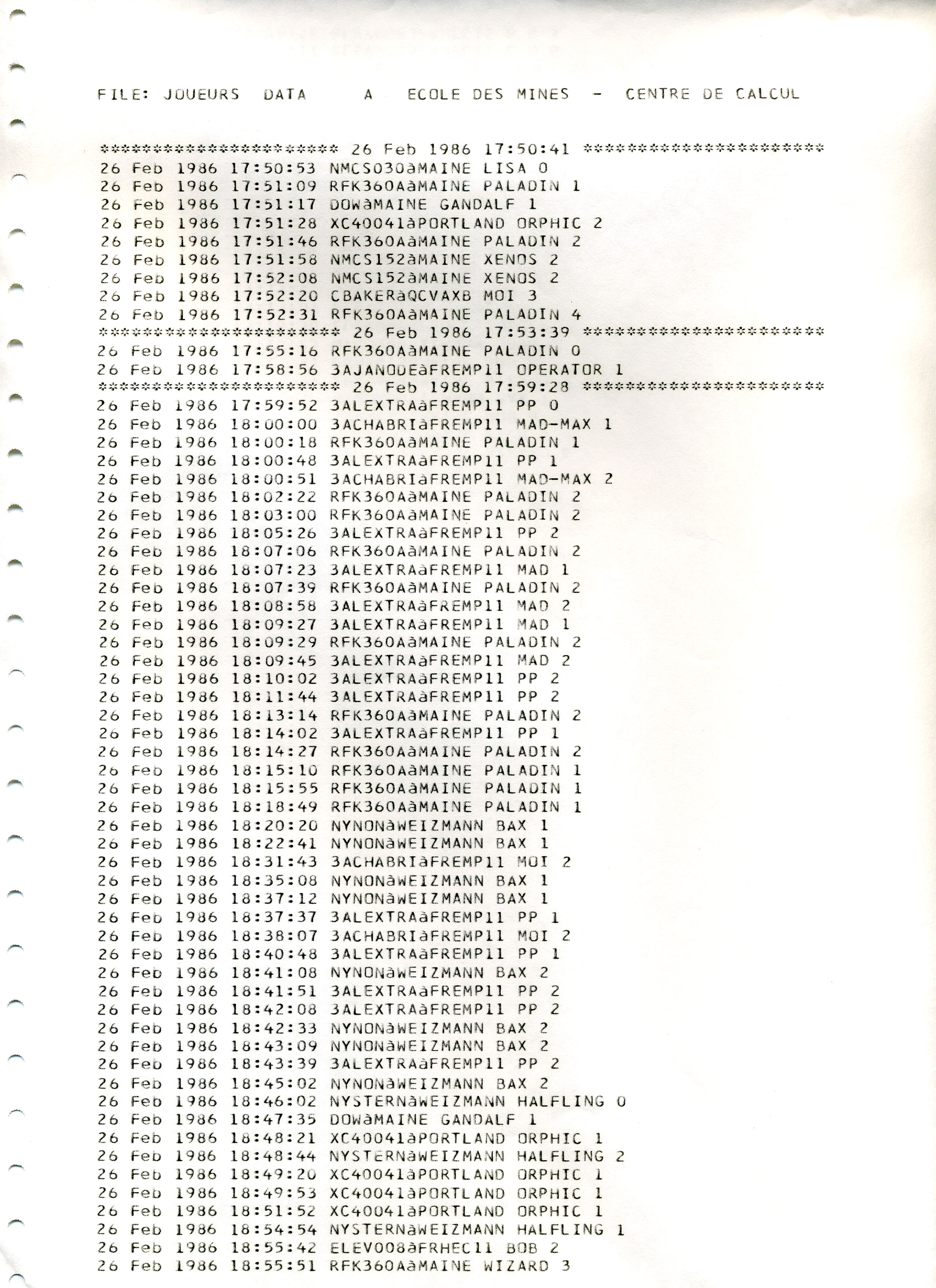
An extract of MAD's connection log from 1986 shows the frequency of connections worldwide.

BITNET hosted its first multi-user dungeon (MUD) in 1984, the text-based MAD. Players connected from the United States, Europe or Israel to a single server running in France.

In 1996, CREN ended their support for BITNET. The individual nodes were free to keep their phone lines up as long as they wished, but as nodes dropped out, the network splintered into parts that were inaccessible from each other. As of 2007, BITNET has essentially ceased operation. However, a successor, BITNET II, which transmits information via the Internet using BITNET protocols, still has some users.

== See also ==
- Christmas Tree EXEC
- History of the Internet
