= List of PowerPC processors =

The following is a list of PowerPC processors.

== General-purpose PowerPC processors ==
=== IBM/Motorola ===
==== PowerPC 600 family ====
- 601 50 and 66 MHz
- 602 consumer products (multiplexed data/address bus)
- 603/603e/603ev notebooks, embedded devices
- 604/604e/604ev workstations and low end servers
- 620 the first 64-bit implementation

==== PowerPC 7xx family ====
- 740/750 (1997) 233–366 MHz

=== Motorola/Freescale ===
==== PowerPC 7xx family ====
- PowerPC 740 and 750, 233–366 MHz
- 745/755, 300–466 MHz

==== PowerPC 74xx family ====
- 7400/7410 350–550 MHz, uses AltiVec, a SIMD extension of the original PPC specs
- 7440/7450 micro-architecture family up to 1.5 GHz and 256 kB on-chip L2 cache and improved Altivec
- 7447/7457 micro-architecture family up to 1.83 GHz with 512 kB on-chip L2 cache
- 7448 micro-architecture family (2.0 GHz) in 90 nm with 1MB L2 cache and slightly improved AltiVec (out of order instructions).
- 8640/8641/8640D/8641D with one or two e600 cores, 1MB L2 cache

=== IBM ===
==== IBM Power microprocessors ====
- POWER3, 64-bit, 200–450 MHz (as POWER3-II), originally the PowerPC 630. Introduced in 1998.
- POWER4, 64-bit, dual core, 1.0–1.9 GHz (as POWER4+), follows the PowerPC 2.00 ISA. Introduced in 2001.
- POWER5, 64-bit, dual core, 2 way SMT/core, 1.6–2.0 GHz, follows the PowerPC 2.01 ISA. Introduced in 2004.
- POWER5+, 64-bit, dual core, 2 way SMT/core, 1.9–2.2 GHz, follows the PowerPC 2.02 ISA. Introduced in 2005.
- POWER6, 64-bit, dual core, 2 way SMT/core, 3.6–4.7 GHz, follows the Power ISA 2.03. Introduced in 2007.
- POWER6+, 64 bit, dual core, 2 way SMT/core, 5.0 GHz, follows the Power ISA 2.05. Introduced in 2009.
- POWER7, 64-bit octo core, 4 way SMT/core, 2.4–4.25 GHz, follows the Power ISA 2.06. Introduced in 2010.
- POWER7+, 64-bit octo core, 4 way SMT/core, 3.0–5.0 GHz, follows the Power ISA 2.06. Introduced in 2012.
- POWER8, 64-bit, hex or twelve core, 8 way SMT/core, 5.0 GHz, follows the Power ISA 2.07. Introduced in 2014.
- POWER9, 64-bit, PowerNV 24 cores of 4 way SMT/core, PowerVM 12 cores of 8 way SMT/core, follows the Power ISA 3.0. Introduced in 2016.
- Power10, 64-bit, 15 SMT8 or 30 SMT4 cores, will follow the Power ISA 3.1. Introduced in 2021.

==== RS64 ====
- A10 (Cobra), 50–77 MHz, 1995, single chip processor for Series i
- A25/30 (Muskie), 125–154 MHz, 1996, multi chip, 4 way SMP for Series i
- RS64 (Apache), 64-bit, 125 MHz, 1997 for large scale SMP systems Series i and Series p
- RS64-II (Northstar), 262 MHz, 1998
- RS64-III (Pulsar, Istar), 450 MHz in 1999, 600 in 2000
- RS64-IV (Sstar), 750 MHz, multithreading, 2000

==== PowerPC 7xx family ====
- 750CL with 256 kB on die L2 cache at 400–900 MHz introduced in 2006
- 750CX/CXe with 256 kB on die L2 cache at 350–600 MHz
- 750FX with 512 kB L2 cache announced by IBM in 2001 and available early 2002 at 1 GHz
- 750GX with 1 MB L2 cache introduced by IBM in 2003

==== PowerPC 970 family (known in Apple products as PowerPC G5) ====
- 970 (2003), 64-bit, derived from POWER4, enhanced with VMX, 512 kB L2 cache, 1.4–2 GHz
- 970FX (2004), manufactured at 90 nm, 1.8–2.7 GHz
- 970GX (2006), manufactured at 90 nm, 1MB L2 cache/core, 1.2–2.5 GHz
- 970MP (2005), dual core, 1 MB L2 cache/core, 1.6–2.5 GHz

==== Cell ====
- Cell BE, 64-bit PPE-core, 2 way multithreading, VMX, 512 kB L2 cache, 8x SPE, 8x 256 kB Local Store memory, 3.2 GHz, follows the PowerPC 2.02 ISA
- Cell BE 65 nm, same as above but manufactured on a 65 nm process
- PowerXCell 8i, same as above but with enhanced double precision SPEs and support for DDR-RAM

==== Supercomputer ====
- Blue Gene/L, dual core PowerPC 440, 700 MHz, 2004
- Blue Gene/P, quad core PowerPC 450, 850 MHz, 2007
- Blue Gene/Q, 18 core PowerPC A2, 1.6 GHz, 2011

=== Other ===
- Exponential Technology x704, a BiCMOS PowerPC implementation, 410 to 533 MHz
- P.A. Semi PWRficient PA6T-1682M, a dual-core microprocessor that runs at 2 GHz

== Embedded PowerPC ==
32-bit and 64-bit PowerPC processors have been a favorite of embedded computer designers. To keep costs low on high-volume competitive products, the CPU core is usually bundled into a system-on-chip (SOC) integrated circuit. SOCs contain the processor core, cache and the processor's local data on-chip, along with clocking, timers, memory (SDRAM), peripheral (network, serial I/O), and bus (PCI, PCI-X, ROM/Flash bus, I2C) controllers. IBM also offers an open bus architecture (called CoreConnect) to facilitate connection of the processor core to memory and peripherals in a SOC design. IBM and Motorola have competed along parallel development lines in overlapping markets. A later development was the Book E PowerPC Specification, implemented by both IBM and Freescale Semiconductor, which defines embedded extensions to the PowerPC programming model.

=== AMCC ===
- 440SP: 533–667 MHz, 10/100/1G Ethernet, (2) 64bit PCI-X, 32bit PCI-X, XOR engine, 32k L1 Cache.
- 440SPe: 533–667 MHz, 10/100/1G Ethernet, (3) 64bit PCI-Express, 64bit PCI-X, XOR engine, 32k L1 Cache.
- 440EPx: 333–667 MHz, (2) 10/100/1G Ethernet, Hardware Security, PCI, DDR-II, FPU, USB 1.1 or USB 2.0, 32k L1 Cache.
- 440GR: 333–667 MHz, (2) 10/100 Ethernet, (4) UART, (2) IIC, 53 GPIO, SPI, 32k L1 Cache.
- 440GRx: 333–667 MHz, (2) 10/100/1G Ethernet, (4) UART, (2) IIC, 53 GPIO, SPI, DDR-II, Hardware Security, 32k L1 Cache.
- PowerPC Titan, 32-bit, dual core, 2 GHz. Announced, planned release in 2008

=== Broad Reach Engineering ===
- BRE440 radiation hardened CPU based on PowerPC 440 core with 256 kB L2 Cache, PCI, (2) 10/100 Ethernet, 4-CH DMA, (2) UART, extensive on chip memory control. Designed specifically for radiation environments and extreme temperature environments (such as space).

=== BAE Systems ===
- IBM RAD6000 radiation hardened CPU based on RISC Single Chip core used by IBM RS/6000.
- RAD750 radiation hardened CPU based on PowerPC 750 core.
- RAD5500 series of radiation hardened CPUs based on PowerPC e5500 core.

=== Culturecom ===
- V-Dragon based on PowerPC 405 core.

=== Cray ===
- SeaStar, SeaStar2 and SeaStar2+, PowerPC 440 based communications processors for their Opteron based XT3, XT4 and XT5 supercomputers.

=== Freescale (former Motorola) ===
- MPC8xx PowerQUICC – networking & telecom card controllers with embedded communications module, up to 80 MHz
- MPC5xx – automotive & industrial controllers
- MPC51xx/MPC52xx – e300 core, automotive & industrial system on a chip (SoC) controllers, up to 466 MHz
- MPC55xx – e200 core, automotive & industrial controllers, up to 144 MHz
- MPC56xx – e200 core, automotive & industrial controllers, up to 264 MHz
- MPC82xx PowerQUICC II – 603e core, networking & telecom SoC controllers with high-capacity on-chip switched bus and communications module, up to 450 MHz
- MPC83xx PowerQUICC II Pro – e300 core, networking & telecom SoC controllers with high-capacity on-chip switched bus and communications module, up to 667 MHz
- MPC85xx PowerQUICC III – e500 core, high end networking & telecom SoC controllers with high-capacity on-chip switched bus and communications module. D Dual core versions supporting both symmetric and asymmetric multiprocessing, up to 1.5 GHz.
- MPC864x – e600 core, 1 MB L2 cache, improved AltiVec (out of order instructions), an embedded memory controller, Ethernet controllers, a RapidIO fabric interface, a PCI Express interface, and MPX bus. Dual core versions supporting both symmetric and asymmetric multiprocessing, up to 1.5 GHz.
- QorIQ Processing Platforms (evolution of the PowerQUICC). The first letter of the model indicates the series, the second and the third model number indicates the number of cores (e.g. P5040 has four cores, T4240 has 24 cores)
  - P series
    - P1 series, e500v2 cores: P1011, P1020
    - P2 series: e500v2 core P2020, e500mc cores P2040, P2041
    - P3 series, introduced in 2010, based on e500mc cores: P3041
    - P4 series, introduced in 2009, based on e500mc cores: P4080
    - P5 series, introduced in 2012, 45 nm process, based on e5500 cores: P5010, P5020, P5021, P5040
  - T series, introduced in 2013, all based on e6500 cores, and 28 nm process
    - T1 series: T1040, T1042, T1020, T1022
    - T2 series: T2080, T2081
    - T4 series: T4240, T4160, T4080

=== IBM (now from AMCC) ===
- 401
- 403: MMU added in most advanced version 403GCX
- 405: MMU, Ethernet, serial, PCI, SRAM, SDRAM; NPe405 adds more network devices
- 440: A range of processors based on the Book E core.
  - 440EP: 333–667 MHz, (2) 10/100 Ethernet, PCI, DDR, FPU, USB 1.1 or USB 2.0, 32k L1 Cache.
  - 440GP: 400–500 MHz, (2) 10/100 Ethernet, PCI-X, DDR, 32k L1 Cache.
  - 440GX: 533–800 MHz, (2) 10/100 Ethernet, (2) 10/100/1G Ethernet with TCP/IP hardware acceleration, PCI-X, DDR, 32k L1 Cache

=== Microsoft ===
- Xenon (Microsoft Xbox 360) – Three core PPE-based, 1 MB shared L2 cache, VMX128, 3.2 GHz

=== Nintendo ===
- Gekko (GameCube) – 750CXe core with special enhancements, 486 MHz
- Broadway (Wii) – 750CL, 729 MHz
- Espresso (Wii U) – 3 × 750 cores, 1.24 GHz

=== P.A. Semi ===
- PWRficient PA6T-1682M: a dual core PPC running at 2 GHz

=== Rapport ===
- Kilocore 1025: a CPU with a single PowerPC core and 1024 processing element (8 bit, 125 MHz) cores (unreleased). This CPU is designed for running security and multimedia applications (with parallel processing) on portable game devices and media players.

=== Xilinx ===
- Some Virtex-II Pro and Virtex-4 FPGA have up to two embedded PowerPC 405 cores.
- Virtex-5 FXT has up to two embedded PowerPC 440 cores.

== Northbridge ==
Northbridge or host bridge for PowerPC CPU is an Integrated Circuit (IC) for interfacing PowerPC CPU with memory, and Southbridge IC. Some Northbridge also provide interface for Accelerated Graphics Ports (AGP) bus, Peripheral Component Interconnect (PCI), PCI-X, PCI Express, or Hypertransport bus. Specific Northbridge IC must be used for PowerPC CPU. It is impossible to use Northbridge for Intel or AMD x86 CPU with PowerPC CPU. However it is possible to use certain types of x86 Southbridge in PowerPC based motherboards. Example: VIA 686B and AMD Geode CS5536.

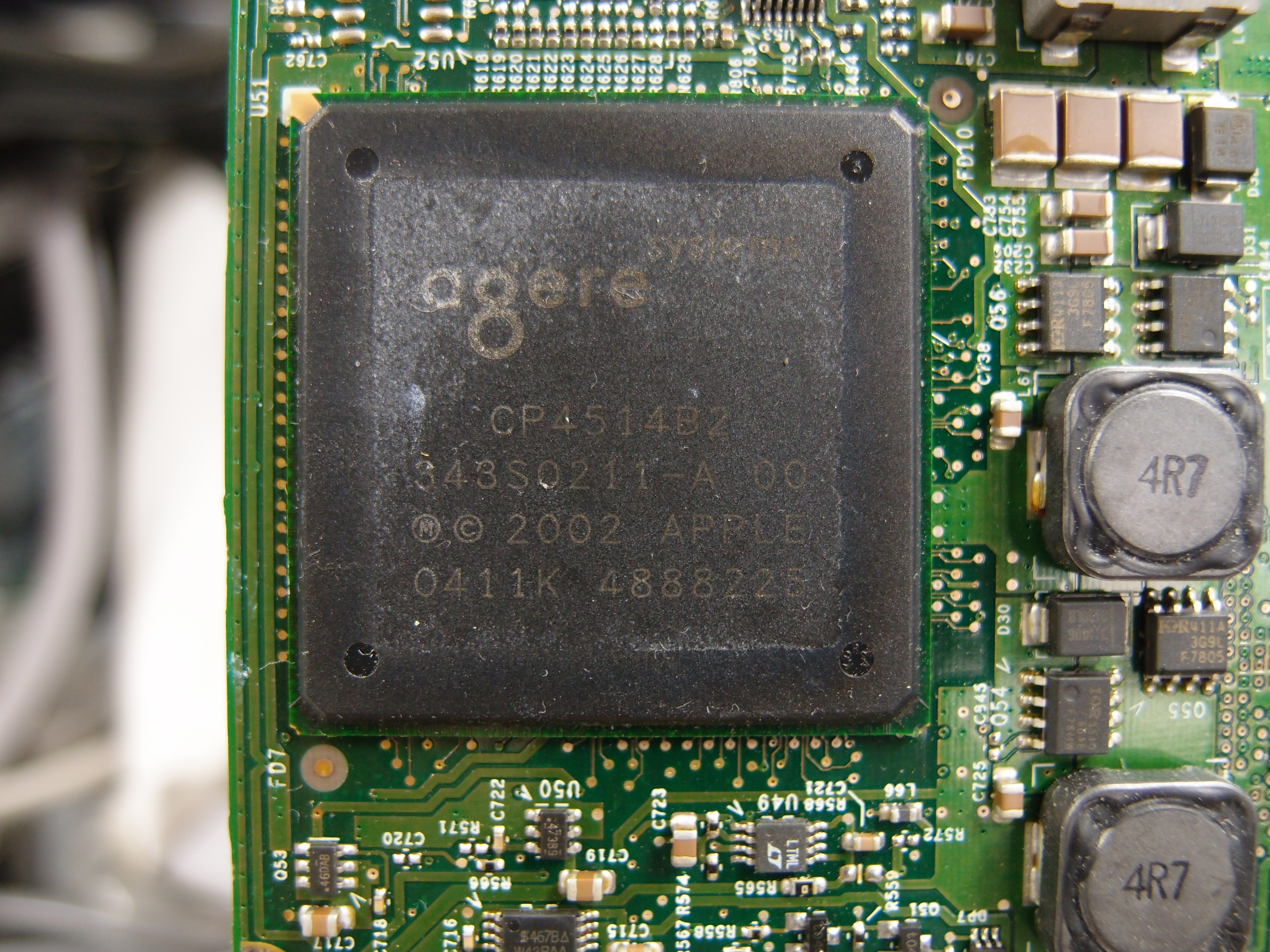
Apple UniNorth 2 AGP used in PowerPC 74xx Based Macs

Apple used their own type of northbridges which were custom ASICs manufactured by VLSI(later Philips),Texas Instruments and Lucent (later agere systems)

List of Northbridge for PowerPC:

- IBM:
  - CPC 700 and CPC 710 for IBM PowerPC 750 series.
  - CPC 925 and CPC 945 for IBM PowerPC 970 series.
- Motorola (now available from Tundra):
  - MPC-105
  - MPC-106
  - MPC-107
- Mentor Arc Inc. (MAI).
  - Articia S.
- Marvell Discovery series for Motorola MPC74xx and MPC75x and IBM 750 series CPU.
  - Discovery ( GT-64260A, GT-64261A and GT-64262A).
  - Discovery LT (MV64420 and MV64430).
  - Discovery II (MV64360, MV6361 and MV6362).
  - Discovery III (MV64460, MV6461 and MV6462).
  - Discovery V (MV 64560).
  - Discovery VI(MV 64660).
- Philips Semiconductor
  - VAS96011 and VAS96012: Two IC northbridge for PowerPC 603 and PowerPC 604.
- Tundra (Canada)
  - TSI-106 (formerly Motorola MPC-106).
  - TSI-107 (formerly Motorola MPC-107) / XPC107APX series.
  - TSI-108
  - TSI-109
  - TSI-110
  - Qspan II – PCI bus interface for PowerPC CPU.
  - PowerPro (CA91L750) – Memory controller for PowerPC CPU.

== See also ==
- PowerPC applications
- Power ISA
- List of PowerPC-based game consoles
