= Comparison of CPU microarchitectures =

The following is a comparison of CPU microarchitectures.

Microarchitecture	Year	Pipeline stages	Misc	Process node & fabs
Elbrus-8S	2014		VLIW, Elbrus (proprietary, closed) version 5, 64-bit	
AMD K5	1996	5	Superscalar, branch prediction, speculative execution, out-of-order execution, register renaming (Note: According to AMDs K5 data sheet. The design incorporates many ideas and functional parts from AMDs Am29000 32-bit RISC microprocessor design.)	
AMD K6	1997	6	Superscalar, branch prediction, speculative execution, out-of-order execution, register renaming (Note: According to AMDs K6 data sheet. The design is based on NexGen's Nx686 and therefore not a direct successor to the K5.)	
AMD K6-III	1999		Branch prediction, speculative execution, out-of-order execution	
AMD K7	1999		Out-of-order execution, branch prediction, Harvard architecture	
AMD K8	2003		64-bit, integrated memory controller, 16 byte instruction prefetching	
AMD K10	2007		Superscalar, out-of-order execution, 32-way set associative L3 victim cache, 32-byte instruction prefetching	
ARM7TDMI (-S)	2001	3		
ARM7EJ-S	2001	5		
ARM810		5	static branch prediction, double-bandwidth memory	
ARM9TDMI	1998	5		
ARM1020E		6		
XScale PXA210/PXA250	2002	7		
ARM1136J(F)-S		8		
ARM1156T2(F)-S		9		
ARM Cortex-A5		8	Multi-core, single issue, in-order	
ARM Cortex-A7 MPCore		8	Partial dual-issue, in-order, 2-way set associative level 1 instruction cache	
ARM Cortex-A8	2005	13	Dual-issue, in-order, speculative execution, superscalar, 2-way pipeline decode	65/55/45 nm
ARM Cortex-A9 MPCore	2007	8–11	Out-of-order, speculative issue, superscalar	65/45/40/32/28 nm
ARM Cortex-A12	2014	8–11		28 nm
ARM Cortex-A15 MPCore	2010	15/17-25	Multi-core (up to 16), out-of-order, speculative issue, 3-way superscalar	32/28/20 nm
ARM Cortex-A17 MPCore		11+		28 nm
Qualcomm Scorpion		10		65/45 nm
Qualcomm Krait		11		28 nm
Swift		12		32 nm
ARM Cortex-A53	2012		Partial dual-issue, in-order	tsmc 6nm
ARM Cortex-A55	2017	8	in-order, speculative execution	tsmc 6 & samsung 4nm
ARM Cortex-A510	2021		in-order, speculative execution	
ARM Cortex-A520	2023		in-order, speculative execution	
ARM C1-Nano	2025		in-order, speculative execution	
ARM Cortex-A57	2012		Deeply out-of-order, wide multi-issue, 3-way superscalar	
ARM Cortex-A72	2015			
ARM Cortex-A73	2016		Out-of-order superscalar	
ARM Cortex-A75	2017	11–13	Out-of-order superscalar, speculative execution, register renaming, 3-way	
ARM Cortex-A76	2018	13	Out-of-order superscalar, 4-way pipeline decode	
ARM Cortex-A77	2019	13	Out-of-order superscalar, speculative execution, register renaming, 6-way pipeline decode, 10-issue, branch prediction, L3 cache	
ARM Cortex-A78	2020	14	Out-of-order superscalar, register renaming, 4-way pipeline decode, 6 instruction per cycle, branch prediction, L3 cache	
ARM Cortex-A710	2021	10		
ARM Cortex-A715	2022			
ARM Cortex-A720	2023			
ARM Cortex-A725	2024			
ARM C1-Pro	2025			
ARM C1-Premium	2025			
ARM Cortex-X1	2020	13	5-wide decode out-of-order superscalar, L3 cache	
ARM Cortex-X2	2021	10		
ARM Cortex-X3	2022	9		
ARM Cortex-X4	2023	10		
ARM Cortex-X925	2024			
ARM C1-Ultra	2025			
AVR32 AP7		7		
AVR32 UC3		3	Harvard architecture	
Bobcat	2011		Out-of-order execution	
Bulldozer	2011	20	Shared multithreaded L2 cache, multithreading, multi-core, around 20 stage long pipeline, integrated memory controller, out-of-order, superscalar, up to 16 cores per chip, up to 16 MB L3 cache, Virtualization, Turbo Core, FlexFPU which uses simultaneous multithreading	
Piledriver	2012		Shared multithreaded L2 cache, multithreading, multi-core, around 20 stage long pipeline, integrated memory controller, out-of-order, superscalar, up to 16 MB L2 cache, up to 16 MB L3 cache, Virtualization, FlexFPU which use simultaneous multithreading, up to 16 cores per chip, up to 5 GHz clock speed, up to 220 W TDP, Turbo Core	
Steamroller	2014		Multi-core, branch prediction	
Excavator	2015	20	Multi-core	
Zen	2017	19	Multi-core, superscalar, 2-way simultaneous multithreading, 4-way decode, out-of-order execution, L3 cache	
Zen+	2018	19	Multi-core, superscalar, 4-way decode, out-of-order execution, L3 cache	
Zen 2	August 7, 2019	19	Multi-chip module, multi-core, superscalar, 4-way decode, out-of-order execution, L3 cache	7nm TMSC
Zen 3	2020	19	Multi-chip module, multi-core, superscalar, 4-way decode, out-of-order execution, SMT, L3 cache	
Zen 4	2022		Multi-chip module, multi-core, superscalar, L3 cache	
Zen 5	2024		Multi-chip module, multi-core, superscalar, L3 cache	
Crusoe	2000		In-order execution, 128-bit VLIW, integrated memory controller	
Efficeon	2004		In-order execution, 256-bit VLIW, fully integrated memory controller	
Cyrix Cx5x86	1995	6	Branch prediction	
Cyrix 6x86	1996		Superscalar, superpipelined, register renaming, speculative execution, out-of-order execution	
DLX		5		
eSi-3200		5	In-order, speculative issue	
eSi-3250		5	In-order, speculative issue	
EV4 (Alpha 21064)			Superscalar	
EV7 (Alpha 21364)			Superscalar design with out-of-order execution, branch prediction, 4-way simultaneous multithreading, integrated memory controller	
EV8 (Alpha 21464)			Superscalar design with out-of-order execution	
65k			Ultra low power consumption, register renaming, out-of-order execution, branch prediction, multi-core, module, capable of reach higher clock	
P5 (Pentium)	1993	5	Superscalar	
P6 (Pentium Pro)		14	Speculative execution, register renaming, superscalar design with out-of-order execution	
P6 (Pentium II)		14	Branch prediction	
P6 (Pentium III)	1995	14		
Intel Itanium "Merced"	2001		Single core, L3 cache	
Intel Itanium 2 "McKinley"	2002	11	Speculative execution, branch prediction, register renaming, 30 execution units, multithreading, multi-core, coarse-grained multithreading, 2-way simultaneous multithreading, Dual-domain multithreading, Turbo Boost, Virtualization, VLIW, RAS with Advanced Machine Check Architecture, Instruction Replay technology, Cache Safe technology, Enhanced SpeedStep technology	
Intel NetBurst (Willamette)	2000	20	2-way simultaneous multithreading (Hyper-threading), Rapid Execution Engine, Execution Trace Cache, quad-pumped Front-Side Bus, Hyper-pipelined Technology, superscalar, out-of order	
NetBurst (Northwood)	2002	20	2-way simultaneous multithreading	
NetBurst (Prescott)	2004	31	2-way simultaneous multithreading	
NetBurst (Cedar Mill)	2006	31	2-way simultaneous multithreading	
Intel Core	2006	12	Multi-core, out-of-order, 4-way superscalar	
Intel Atom		16	2-way simultaneous multithreading, in-order, no instruction reordering, speculative execution, or register renaming	
Intel Atom Oak Trail			2-way simultaneous multithreading, in-order, burst mode, 512 KB L2 cache	
Intel Atom Bonnell	2008		SMT	
Intel Atom Silvermont	2013		Out-of-order execution	
Intel Atom Goldmont	2016		Multi-core, out-of-order execution, 3-wide superscalar pipeline, L2 cache	
Intel Atom Goldmont Plus	2017		Multi-core	
Intel Atom Tremont	2019		Multi-core, superscalar, out-of-order execution, speculative execution, register renaming	
Intel Atom Gracemont	2021		Multi-core, superscalar, out-of-order execution, speculative execution, register renaming	
Intel Atom Crestmont	2023		Multi-core	
Intel Atom Skymont	2024		Multi-core	
Intel Atom Darkmont	2025		Multi-core	
Nehalem	2008	14	2-way simultaneous multithreading, out-of-order, 6-way superscalar, integrated memory controller, L1/L2/L3 cache, Turbo Boost	
Sandy Bridge	2011	14	2-way simultaneous multithreading, multi-core, on-die graphics and PCIe controller, system agent with integrated memory and display controller, ring interconnect, L1/L2/L3 cache, micro-op cache, 2 threads per core, Turbo Boost,	
Intel Haswell	2013	14–19	SoC design, multi-core, multithreading, 2-way simultaneous multithreading, hardware-based transactional memory (in selected models), L4 cache (in GT3 models), Turbo Boost, out-of-order execution, superscalar, up to 8 MB L3 cache (mainstream), up to 20 MB L3 cache (Extreme)	
Broadwell	2014	14–19	Multi-core, multithreading	
Skylake	2015	14–19	Multi-core, L4 cache on certain Skylake-R, Skylake-U and Skylake-Y models. On-package PCH on U, Y, m3, m5 and m7 models. 5 wide superscalar/5 issues.	
Kaby Lake	2016	14–19	Multi-core, L4 cache on certain low and ultra low power models (Kaby Lake-U and Kaby Lake-Y),	
Intel Sunny Cove	2019	14–20	Multicore, 2-way multithreading, massive OoOE engine, 5 wide superscalar/5 issue.	
Intel Cypress Cove	2021	12–14	multicore, 5 wide superscalar/6 issues, massive OoOE engine, big core design.	
Intel Willow Cove	2020		Multicore, SMT	
Intel Golden Cove	2021	12–14	Multicore, SMT, 6 wide superscalar, massive OoOE engine, big core	
Intel Redwood Cove	2023		Multicore, SMT	
Intel Lion Cove	2024	12	Multicore, without SMT, 8 wide decoder, big core.	
Intel Cougar Cove	2025			
Intel Xeon Phi 7120x	2013	7-stage integer, 6-stage vector	Multi-core, multithreading, 4 hardware-based simultaneous threads per core which can't be disabled unlike regular HyperThreading, Time-multiplexed multithreading, 61 cores per chip, 244 threads per chip, 30.5 MB L2 cache, 300 W TDP, Turbo Boost, in-order dual-issue pipelines, coprocessor, Floating-point accelerator, 512-bit wide Vector-FPU	
LatticeMico32	2006	6	Harvard architecture	
Nvidia Denver	2014		Multicore, superscalar, 2-way decode, L2	
Nvidia Carmel	2018		Multicore, 10-way superscalar, L3	
POWER1	1990		Superscalar, out-of-order execution	
POWER3	1998		Superscalar, out-of-order execution	
POWER4	2001		Superscalar, speculative execution, out-of-order execution	
POWER5	2004		2-way simultaneous multithreading, out-of-order execution, integrated memory controller	
IBM POWER6	2007		2-way simultaneous multithreading, in-order execution, up to 5 GHz	
IBM POWER7+			Multi-core, multithreading, out-of-order, superscalar, 4 intelligent simultaneous threads per core, 12 execution units per core, 8 cores per chip, 80 MB L3 cache, true hardware entropy generator, hardware-assisted cryptographic acceleration, fixed-point unit, decimal fixed-point unit, Turbo Core, decimal floating-point unit	
IBM POWER8	2013	15–23	Superscalar, L4 cache	
IBM POWER9	2017	12–16	Superscalar, out-of-order execution, L4 cache	
IBM Power10	2021		Superscalar	
IBM Cell	2006		Multi-core, multithreading, 2-way simultaneous multithreading (PPE), Power Processor Element, Synergistic Processing Elements, Element Interconnect Bus, in-order execution	
IBM Cyclops64			Multi-core, multithreading, 2 threads per core, in-order	
IBM zEnterprise zEC12	2012	15/16/17	Multi-core, 6 cores per chip, up to 5.5 GHz, superscalar, out-of-order, 48 MB L3 cache, 384 MB shared L4 cache	
IBM A2		15	multicore, 4-way simultaneous multithreaded	
PowerPC 401	1996	3		
PowerPC 405	1998	5		
PowerPC 440	1999	7		
PowerPC 470	2009	9	Symmetric multiprocessing (SMP)	
PowerPC e300		4	Superscalar, branch prediction	
PowerPC e500		Dual 7 stage	Multi-core	
PowerPC e600		3-issue 7 stage	Superscalar out-of-order execution, branch prediction	
PowerPC e5500	2010	4-issue 7 stage	Out-of-order, multi-core	
PowerPC e6500	2012		Multi-core	
PowerPC 603		4	5 execution units, branch prediction, no SMP	
PowerPC 603q	1996	5	In-order	
PowerPC 604	1994	6	Superscalar, out-of-order execution, 6 execution units, SMP support	
PowerPC 620	1997	5	Out-of-order execution, SMP support	
PWRficient PA6T	2007		Superscalar, out-of-order execution, 6 execution units	
R4000	1991	8	Scalar	
StrongARM SA-110	1996	5	Scalar, in-order	
SuperH SH2		5		
SuperH SH2A	2006	5	Superscalar, Harvard architecture	
SPARC			Superscalar	
hyperSPARC	1993		Superscalar	
SuperSPARC	1992		Superscalar, in-order	
SPARC64 VI/VII/VII+	2007		Superscalar, out-of-order	
UltraSPARC	1995	9		
UltraSPARC T1	2005	6	Open source, multithreading, multi-core, 4 threads per core, scalar, in-order, integrated memory controller, 1 FPU	
UltraSPARC T2	2007	8	Open source, multithreading, multi-core, 8 threads per core	
SPARC T3	2010	8	Multithreading, multi-core, 8 threads per core, SMP, 16 cores per chip, 2 MB L3 cache, in-order, hardware random number generator	
Oracle SPARC T4	2011	16	Multithreading, multi-core, 8 fine-grained threads per core of which 2 can be executed simultaneously, 2-way simultaneous multithreading, SMP, 8 cores per chip, out-of-order, 4 MB L3 cache, out-of order, Hardware random number generator	
Oracle Corporation SPARC T5	2013	16	Multithreading, multi-core, 8 fine-grained threads per core of which 2 can be executed simultaneously, 2-way simultaneous multithreading, 16 cores per chip, out-of-order, 16-way associative shared 8 MB L3 cache, hardware-assisted cryptographic acceleration, stream-processing unit, out-of order execution, RAS features, 16 cryptography units per chip, hardware random number generator	
Oracle SPARC M5		16	Multithreading, multi-core, 8 fine-grained threads per core of which 2 can be executed simultaneously, 2-way simultaneous multithreading, 6 cores per chip, out-of-order, 48 MB L3 cache, out-of order execution, RAS features, stream-processing unit, hardware-assisted cryptographic acceleration, 6 cryptography units per chip, Hardware random number generator	
Fujitsu SPARC64 X			Multithreading, multi-core, 2-way simultaneous multithreading, 16 cores per chip, out-of order, 24 MB L2 cache, out-of order, RAS features	
Imagination Technologies MIPS Warrior				
VIA C7	2005		In-order execution	
VIA Nano (Isaiah)	2008		Superscalar out-of-order execution, branch prediction, 7 execution units	
WinChip	1997	4	In-order execution	

== See also ==
- Processor design
- Comparison of instruction set architectures
- List of AMD CPU microarchitectures
- List of Intel CPU microarchitectures
- Comparison of ARM CPU's
- Semiconductor intellectual property core
- Processor design
- Microarchitecture
