= Ppc64 =

64-bit big-endian PowerPC architecture

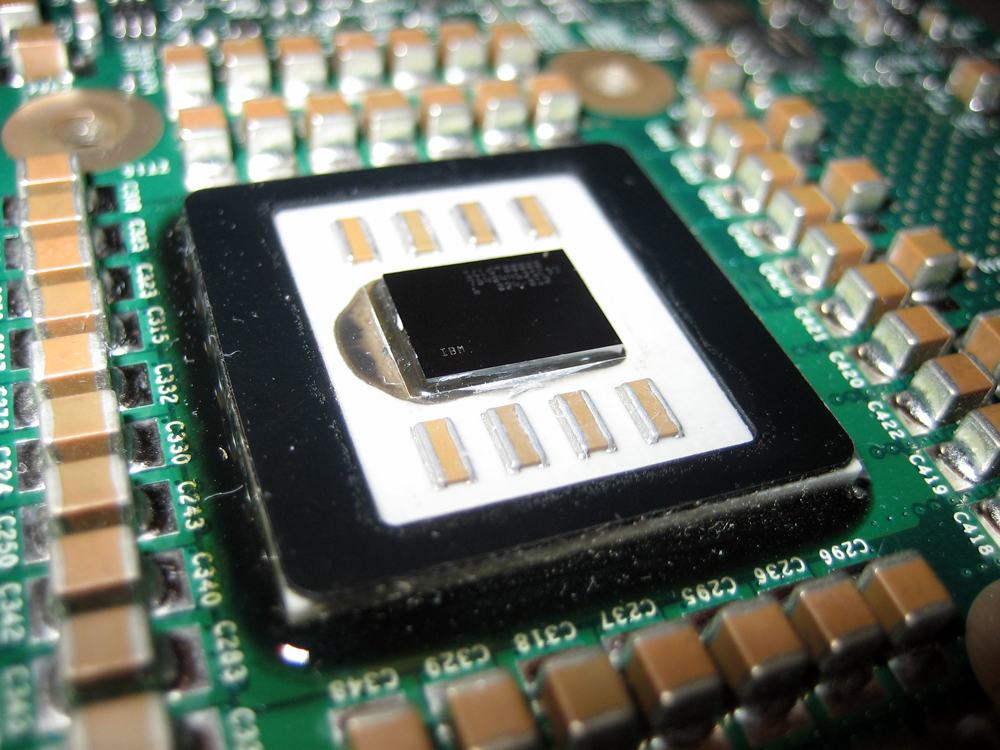
The PowerPC 970 was released in 2003 and was one of the first 64-bit processors developed for consumer-type computers, PowerMac G5 in this case.

ppc64 is an identifier commonly used within the Linux, GNU Compiler Collection (GCC) and LLVM free software communities to refer to the target architecture for applications optimized for 64-bit big-endian PowerPC and Power ISA processors.

ppc64le is a pure little-endian mode that has been introduced with the POWER8 as the prime target for technologies provided by the OpenPOWER Foundation, aiming at enabling porting of the x86 Linux-based software with minimal effort.

== Details ==
These two identifiers are frequently used when compiling source code to identify the target architecture.

64-bit Power and PowerPC processors are the following:

- PowerPC 620
- RS64 – Apache, RS64-II Northstar, RS64-III Pulsar/IStar, and RS64-IV SStar
- POWER3 and POWER3-II
- POWER4 and POWER4+
- PowerPC 970, 970FX, 970MP and 970GX
- POWER5 and POWER5+
- PPE in Cell BE, PowerXCell 8i and Xenon.
- PWRficient
- POWER6 and POWER6+
- POWER7 and POWER7+
- A2, A2I (used in the Blue Gene/Q) and A2O
- PowerPC e5500 core based
- PowerPC e6500 core based
- POWER8 – P8-6c Murano, P8-12c Turismo and Venice, P8E (with NVLink) and CP1
- POWER9 – P9C Cumulus, P9N Nimbus and P9 AIO Axone
- Power10
- Microwatt, open source soft core
- Chiselwatt, open source soft core

Defunct 64-bit PowerPC processors are the Motorola G5 and PowerPC e700.
