= Motorola G5 project =

The Motorola G5 project was an unsuccessful attempt around 2000-2001 to create a 64-bit PowerPC processor, as a successor to Motorola's PowerPC 7400 series. On roadmaps from the era it was designated PowerPC 7500.

It has been suggested that Motorola had a working "G5" chip, but said chip failed in the early stages of mass production and thus could not be widely made into a usable chip.

When Apple began producing 64-bit systems under the G5 brand, they used IBM's PowerPC 970, which is also known as the PowerPC G5.

== See also ==
- AIM alliance
- ppc64
- PowerPC e700
- PWRficient
