= RAD5500 =

Radiation-hardened 64-bit processor core design

General information
- Designed by: IBM, Freescale
- Common manufacturer: BAE

Performance
- Max. CPU clock rate: 66 MHz to 462 MHz

Physical specifications
- Cores: 1, 4

Architecture and classification
- Application: Radiation hardened
- Technology node: RH45 (45 nm SOI)
- Microarchitecture: PowerPC e5500
- Instruction set: Power ISA v.2.06

History
- Predecessor: RAD750
- Successor

The RAD5500 is a radiation-hardened 64-bit processor core design created by BAE Systems Electronics, Intelligence & Support based on the PowerPC e5500 designed by IBM and Freescale Semiconductor. Successor of the RAD750, the RAD5500 processor platform is for use in high radiation environments experienced on board satellites and spacecraft.

The RAD5500 core supports VPX high speed connectors, DDR2/DDR3 memory, serialize/deserialize (SerDes), and SpaceWire IO.

== Processors ==
The RAD5500 core is based on those of the Freescale Semiconductor e5500-based QorIQ system-on-chip. The RAD5510, RAD5515, RAD5545, RADSPEED-HB (host bridge), and RAD510 are five system on a chip processors implemented with RAD5500 cores produced with 45 nm SOI technology from the IBM Trusted Foundry.

=== RAD5510 and RAD5515 ===
The RAD5510 and RAD5515 processors employ a single RAD5500 core and are intended for medium processing capability in environments that require low power consumption (11.5 and 13.7 watts respectively). This processor provides up to 1.4 giga operations per second (GOPS) and 0.9 GFLOPS of performance. The RAD5515 is distinguished from the RAD5510 by the addition of RapidIO.

=== RAD5545 ===
The RAD5545 processor employs four RAD5500 cores, achieving performance characteristics of up to 5.6 GOPS and over 3.7 GFLOPS. Power consumption is 20 watts with all peripherals operating.

=== RADSPEED-HB (host bridge) ===
Based on the RAD5545, the RADSPEED-HB is intended for host processing and data management support for one to four RADSPEED DSPs. The RADSPEED-HB replaces a secondary DDR2/DDR3 memory interface connection found on the RAD5545 with connections for RADSPEED DSPs instead. RADSPEED DSPs are entirely different processors that are specialized for digital signal processing and are not to be confused with the RADSPEED-HB, which serves as a host bridge.

=== RAD510 ===
The RAD510 system on a chip is marketed as a higher-performance and lower-power modern alternative to the RAD750 chips, for customers who do not need the performance of a RAD5545-based computer. Unlike the RAD5545, it is a single-core SoC.

== Single-board computers ==
=== RAD5545 SpaceVPX ===
The RAD5545 SpaceVPX single-board computer is for use in the harsh environmental conditions of outer space; designed for operating in temperatures between −55 °C and 125 °C and radiation-hardened for a total ionizing dose of 100 krad (for the silicon chips). It is a 6U-220 format module, compliant to the ANSI/VITA 78.00 SpaceVPX standard, and includes either a RAD5515 or RAD5545 processor. The RAD5545 SpaceVPX single-board computer is produced BAE Systems's facility in Manassas, Virginia, which is a U.S. Department of Defense Category 1A Microelectronics Trusted Source.

=== Endura 3U CompactPCI ===
The Endura 3U CompactPCI single-board computer has a form factor of 100 mm × 160 mm and uses the RAD510 system on a chip. Its processor core operating frequency can range from 66 MHz to 462 MHz, supporting both low-power and high-performance applications. On-board volatile memory is provided by 1 GB SDRAM with Single Nibble Correct Double Nibble Detect (SNCDND) ECC. On-board non-volatile memory for general storage is provided by a 1 GB Triple Modular Redundant (TMR) NAND Flash. Separately, the start-up ROM is stored in 2 MB MRAM. Interfaces include a 32-bit, 33 MHz PCI interface with central resource capability, four external SpaceWire ports, SPI, JTAG Master, and UART.

== See also ==
- QorIQ P5 series
