= DPAA =

DPAA may refer to:

- Data Path Acceleration Architecture (DPAA)
- Department of Defense POW/MIA Accounting Agency
