= VSX =

VSX may refer to:

- Visual Studio Extensibility, a feature of Microsoft's Visual Studio
- Power VSX (Vector Scalar Extension), SIMD instructions
- VSX, a file format of Microsoft Visio
- International Variable Star Index
