= Comparison of CPUs =

Comparison of CPUs may refer to:

- Comparison of CPU microarchitectures
- Comparison of instruction set architectures

== See also ==
- List of AMD microprocessors
- List of Intel microprocessors
