= List of NXP products =

The following is a partial list of NXP and Freescale Semiconductor products, including products formerly manufactured by Motorola until 2004. NXP and Freescale merged in 2015.

== Microprocessors ==
=== Early microprocessors ===
- Motorola MC10800 (4-bit)
- Motorola MC14500B Industrial Control Unit (ICU) (1-bit)
- Signetics 2650 (8-bit)
- Motorola 6800 (8-bit)
- Motorola 6802 (8-bit)
- Motorola 6808 (8-bit)
- Motorola 6809 (8/16-bit)

=== 68000 series ===
- Motorola 68000 (16/32-bit)
- Motorola 68008 (8/16/32-bit)
- Motorola 68010 (16/32-bit)
- Motorola 68012 (16/32-bit)
- Motorola 68020 (32-bit)
- Motorola 68030 (32-bit)
- Motorola 68451 (MMU)
- Motorola 68851 (MMU)
- Motorola 68881 (FPU)
- Motorola 68882 (FPU)
- Motorola 68040 (w/FPU)
- Motorola 68060 (w/FPU)

=== 88000 series (RISC) ===
- Motorola 88100
- Motorola 88110

=== PowerPC and Power ISA processors ===
- PPC 601 ("G1")
- PPC 603/PPC 603ev ("G2")
- PPC 604/PPC 604e/PPC 604ev
- PPC 620
- PowerPC 7xx family, PowerPC 740, 750, 745, and 755 only ("PowerPC G3")
- MPC8xx (PowerQUICC)
- MPC82xx (PowerQUICC II, G2 core)
- MPC83xx (PowerQUICC II Pro, e300 core)
- MPC85xx (PowerQUICC III, e500 core)
- MPC86xx (e600 core)
- MPC87xx (future e700 core, never released)
- Pxxxx (QorIQ, e500 cores, e5500 cores)
- Txxxx (QorIQ, e6500 cores))

=== ARM cores ===
==== i.MX ====
ARM920 based:

- i.MX1 (MC9328MX1)
- i.MXL (MC9328MXL)
- i.MXS (MC9328MXS)

ARM926 based:

- i.MX21 (MC9328MX21)
- i.MX23 (MCIMX23)
- i.MX25 (MCIMX25)
- i.MX27 (MCIMX27)
- i.MX28 (MCIMX28)

ARM11 based:

- i.MX31 (MCIMX31)
- i.MX35 (MCIMX355)
- i.MX37 (MCIMX37)

Cortex-A8 based:

- i.MX51 family (e.g. MCIMX515)
- i.MX50 family (i.MX508)
- i.MX53 family (e.g. MCIMX535)

Cortex-A9 based:

- i.MX6 solo
- i.MX6 dual
- i.MX6 quad

Cortex-A7 based:

- i.MX7

Cortex-A72 based:

- i.MX8

==== S32 ====
ARM Cortex-A53 and/or ARM Cortex-M4 based:

- S32V234
- S32V3xx

==== Layerscape / QorIQ ====
ARM Cortex-A7 based:

- LS1020A
- LS1021A
- LS1022A

ARM Cortex-A9 based:

- LS1024A

ARM Cortex-A53 based:

- LS1012A
- LS1043A
- LS1046A
- LS1088A

ARM Cortex-A72 based:

- LS1028A
- LS2084A/44A
- LS2048A/44A
- LS2160A (16x Cortex-A72)

== Microcontrollers ==
=== 6800 series ===
==== 8-bit ====
- Motorola 6801/6803
- Motorola 6802
- Motorola 6804
- Motorola 6805/146805
- Motorola 68HC05 (CPU05) - legacy
- Freescale 68HC11 (CPU11) - legacy
- Freescale 68HC08 (CPU08) 0.65 μm, 0.5 μm and 0.25 μm technologies
- Freescale S08 (CPUS08) 0.25 μm
- Freescale RS08 (CPURS08) 0.25 μm - based on the RS08 core, an S08 with restricted CPU. less instructions set for lower cost.

==== 16-bit ====
- Freescale 68HC16 (CPU16) - legacy
- Freescale 68HC12 (CPU12) - legacy
- Freescale S12 (CPU12) - still being developed
- Freescale S12X (CPU12X-1) - S12XD, S12XA... family of devices with XGATE Coprocessor. Like a DMA or I/O coprocessor.
- Freescale S12XE (CPU12X-2) - S12XE family of devices with XGATE Coprocessor, Emulated EEPROM = EEEPROM. 0.18 μm technology.

=== 68000 series ===
- Freescale 683XX
- Freescale DragonBall
- Freescale ColdFire
- Freescale ColdFire+

==== M·CORE-based ====
The M·CORE-based RISC microcontrollers are 32 bit processors specifically designed for low-power electronics. M·CORE processors, like 68000 family processors, have a user mode and a supervisor mode, and in user mode both see a 32 bit PC and 16 registers, each 32 bits. The M·CORE instruction set is very different from the 68k instruction set—in particular, M·CORE is a pure load-store machine and all M·CORE instructions are 16 bit, while 68k instructions are a variety of lengths. However, 68k assembly language source code can be mechanically translated to M·CORE assembly language.

The M·CORE processor core has been licensed by Atmel for smart cards.

- MMC2001
- MMC2114

=== Power-Architecture ===
- MPC5xx
- MPC512x (e300 core)
- MPC52xx (e300 core)
- MPC55xx (e200 core)
- MPC56xx (e200 core)
- MPC57xx (e200 core)

=== ARM11 Application Processor with Modem ===
- MXC275-30 (523MHz, 2.5G/2.75G)
- MXC300-30 (523MHz, 3G)

=== ARM Cortex-M cores ===
==== Cortex-M0+ microcontrollers ====
- Kinetis L series
- Kinetis E series
- Kinetis M series
- Kinetis W series

==== Cortex-M4 microcontrollers ====
- Kinetis K series
- Kinetis KW2x series

see also: S32K

=== ARM7 cores ===
==== ARM7TDMI automotive microcontrollers ====
- MAC71xx
- MAC72xx

=== TPU and ETPU modules ===
The Time Processing Unit (TPU) and Enhanced Time Processing Unit (eTPU) are largely autonomous timing peripherals found on some Freescale parts.

- MC68332 (TPU)
- MPC5554 (PowerPC) (eTPU)
- MPC5777C (PowerPC) (eTPU2+)
- MCF5232, MCF5233, MCF5234, MCF5235 (ColdFire) (eTPU)

== Digital signal processors ==
Note: the 56XXX series is commonly known as the 56000 series, or 56K, and similarly the 96XXX is known as the 96000 series, or 96K.

=== 56000 series ===
- Motorola DSP560XX (24-bit)
- Motorola DSP563XX (16/24-bit)
- Motorola DSP566XX (16-bit)
- Motorola DSP567XX (Digital Signal Controller)
- Motorola DSP568XX (Digital Signal Controller)

=== 96000 series ===
- Motorola DSP96XXX (32-bit)

=== StarCore series ===
Note: "There is no native support for floating point operations on StarCore"

- MSC8101/3 Single SC140 core, 300 MHz (End of life)
- MSC8102 Quad SC140 core, 275 MHz (Discontinued)
- MSC8122/26 Quad SC140 core, 500 MHz
- MSC711x Single SC1400 core, 200/300 MHz (Partly discontinued)
- MSC8144/E Quad SC3400 core, 1 GHz
- MSC8156/E Six-core SC3850 core, 1 GHz with MAPLE-B coprocessor
- MSC8154/E Quad-core SC3850 core, 1 GHz with MAPLE-B coprocessor
- MSC8152 Dual-core SC3850 core, 1 GHz with MAPLE-B coprocessor
- MSC8151 Single-core SC3850 core, 1 GHz with MAPLE-B coprocessor
- MSC8256 Six-core SC3850 core, 1 GHz
- MSC8254 Quad-core SC3850 core, 1 GHz
- MSC8252 Dual-core SC3850 core, 1 GHz
- MSC8251 Single-core SC3850 core, 1 GHz

== MEMS Sensors ==
- MMA Series (Multi-G/ Multi-Axis Accelerometers)
- MPX Series Pressure
- MPR Series Proximity

== Reconfigurable compute fabric device ==
- MRC6011

== Software ==
- CodeWarrior Integrated Development Environment
- MQX Real Time Operating System
- FreeMaster
- Processor Expert
- PEG Graphical User Interface Development
- Sensor Toolkit
- Wireless Connectivity Toolkit
