= PowerPC e500 =

Microprocessor core

The PowerPC e500 is a 32-bit microprocessor core from Freescale Semiconductor. The core is compatible with the older PowerPC Book E specification as well as the Power ISA v.2.03. It has a dual issue, seven-stage pipeline with FPUs (from version 2 onwards), 32/32 KiB data and instruction L1 caches and 256, 512 or 1024 KiB L2 frontside cache. Speeds range from 533 MHz up to 1.5 GHz, and the core is designed to be highly configurable and meet the specific needs of embedded applications with features like multi-core operation interface for auxiliary application processing units (APU).

e500 powers the high-performance PowerQUICC III system on a chip (SoC) network processors and they all share a common naming scheme, MPC85xx. Freescale's new QorIQ is the evolutionary step from PowerQUICC III and will also be based on e500 cores.

== Versions ==
There are three versions of the e500 core, namely the original e500v1, the e500v2 and the e500mc.

A 64-bit evolution of the e500mc core is called the e5500 core and was introduced in 2010, and a subsequent e6500 core added multithreading capabilities in 2012.

=== e500v1 ===
- Support for the SPE (Signal Processing Engine) extensions. The integer register file is extended to a width of 64-bits. The non-SPE instructions only access and write to the low 32-bits. However the SIMD SPE instructions read and write from the full 64-bits. These extensions overlap with the string and AltiVec instructions.
- Support for SPESFP (Single Precision Embedded Scalar Floating Point). This is a new floating point unit (FPU) that is distinct from the classic FPU, the latter of which is lacking in e500v1 and e500v2. SPESFP uses the integer register file. It is not completely IEEE754 compliant.

=== e500v2 ===
Key improvements in the e500v2 over the e500v1 include:

- Increase from 32-bit (4 GiB) to 36-bit (64 GiB) physical address space. This change means that e500v2-based devices often use a more advanced board support package (BSP) than e500v1-based devices, as various peripheral units have moved to physical addresses higher than 4 GiB.
- Addition of 1 GiB and 4 GiB variable-page sizes
- Addition of DPESFP (double-precision embedded scalar floating point) support. Building on top of SPESFP, these instructions access both halves of the 64-bit integer register.
- Doubling in size and associativity of the memory management unit (MMU) second-level 4K-page array (from 256-entry 2-way to 512-entry 4-way)
- Increase from 3 to 5 maximum outstanding data cache misses
- Addition of the Alternate Time Base for cycle-granularity timestamps

=== e500mc ===
Freescale introduced the e500mc in the QorIQ family of chips in June 2008. The e500mc has the following features:

- Power ISA v.2.06, which includes hypervisor and virtualization functionality for embedded platforms.
- The "classic" floating-point unit has been reinstated.
- SPE, SPESFP, and DPESFP are all removed, and the integer register file is back to 32 bits.
- Support anything from two to more than 32 cores (not necessarily the same type of cores) on a single chip.
- Supports the CoreNet communications fabric for connecting cores and datapath accelerators.
- e500mc cores have private L2 caches but typically share other facilities like L3 caches, memory controllers, application specific acceleration cores, I/O and such.

== Applications ==
=== PowerQUICC ===
All PowerQUICC 85xx devices are based on e500v1 or e500v2 cores, most of them on the latter.

=== QorIQ ===
In June 2008 Freescale announced the QorIQ brand, microprocessors based on the e500 family of cores.

== Software ==
In free and open source software, the e500/MPC85xx family (minus the e500mc, which has no SPE) is generally known as "PPC SPE" (powerpcspe), with the EABI known as "eabispe". Both GCC (before version 9) and LLVM offer support for compiling to this platform, and QEMU provides emulation. Debian used to offer an unofficial port for the e500v2 called powerpcspe.

== See also ==
- PowerQUICC
- QorIQ
- PowerPC e200
- PowerPC e5500
