= RAD750 =

Radiation-hardened computer (2001)

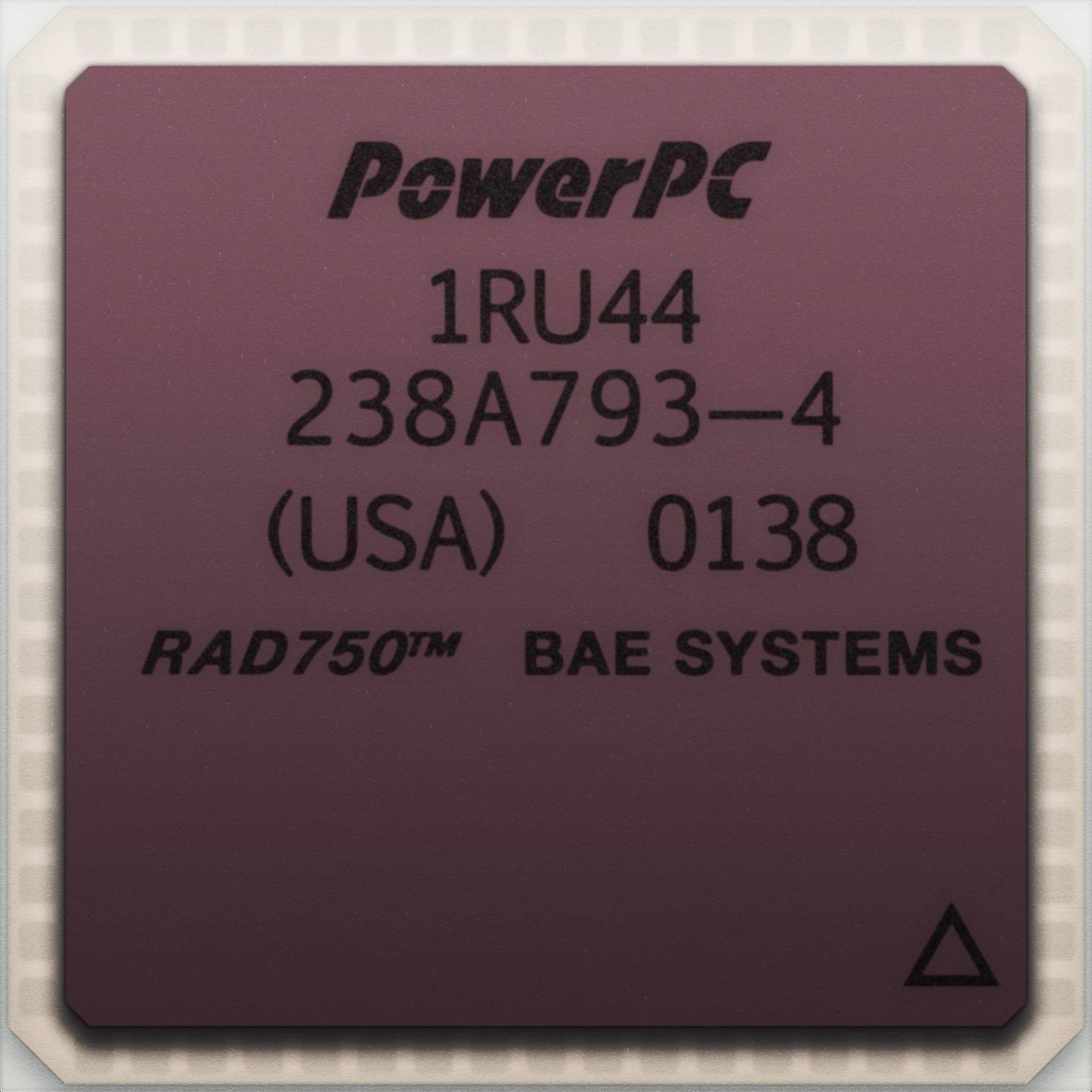
- RAD750

General information
- Launched: 2001
- Designed by: IBM
- Common manufacturer: BAE

Performance
- Max. CPU clock rate: 110 MHz to 200 MHz

Physical specifications
- Cores: 1

Cache
- L1 cache: 32 KB instruction + 32 KB data

Architecture and classification
- Application: Radiation-hardened
- Technology node: 250 nm to 150 nm
- Microarchitecture: PowerPC 750
- Instruction set: PowerPC v.1.1

History
- Predecessor: RAD6000
- Successor: RAD5500

The RAD750 is a radiation-hardened single-board computer manufactured by BAE Systems Electronics, Intelligence & Support. The successor of the RAD6000, the RAD750 is for use in high-radiation environments experienced on board satellites and spacecraft. The RAD750 was released in 2001, with the first units launched into space in 2005.

== Technology ==
The CPU has 10.4 million transistors, an order of magnitude more than the RAD6000 (which had 1.1 million). It is manufactured using either 250 or 150 nm photolithography and has a die area of 130 mm^{2}. It has a core clock of 110 to 200 MHz and can process at 266 MIPS or more. The CPU can include an extended L2 cache to improve performance. The CPU can withstand an absorbed radiation dose of 2,000 to 10,000 grays (200,000 to 1,000,000 rads), temperatures between −55 °C and 125 °C, and requires 5 watts of power. The standard RAD750 single-board system (CPU and motherboard) can withstand 1,000 grays (100,000 rads), temperatures between −55 °C and 70 °C, and requires 10 watts of power.

The RAD750 system has a price that is comparable to the RAD6000, the latter of which as of 2002 was listed at US$200,000 (equivalent to $349,639 in 2024). Customer program requirements and quantities, however, greatly affect the final unit costs.

The RAD750 is based on the PowerPC 750. Its packaging and logic functions are completely compatible with the PowerPC 7xx family.

The term RAD750 is a registered trademark of BAE Systems Information and Electronic Systems Integration Inc.

== Deployment ==
In 2010, it was reported that there were over 150 RAD750s used in a variety of spacecraft. Notable examples, in order of launch date, include:

- Deep Impact comet-chasing spacecraft, launched in January 2005 – first to use the RAD750 computer.
- XSS 11, small experimental satellite, launched 11 April 2005.
- Mars Reconnaissance Orbiter, launched 12 August 2005.
- SECCHI (Sun Earth Connection Coronal and Heliospheric Investigation) instrument package on each of the STEREO spacecraft, launched 15 October 2006.
- WorldView-1 satellite, launched 18 September 2007, has two RAD750s.
- Fermi Gamma-ray Space Telescope, formerly GLAST, launched 11 June 2008.
- Kepler space telescope, launched in March 2009.
- Lunar Reconnaissance Orbiter, launched on 18 June 2009.
- Wide-field Infrared Survey Explorer (WISE), launched 14 December 2009.
- Solar Dynamics Observatory, launched 11 February 2010.
- Juno spacecraft, launched 5 August 2011.
- Curiosity rover, launched 26 November 2011.
- Van Allen Probes, launched on 30 August 2012.
- InSight, launched on 5 May 2018.
- Perseverance rover, launched 30 July 2020.
- James Webb Space Telescope, launched 25 December 2021, uses one RAD750 clocked at 118 MHz.
- Global Precipitation Measurement Core Observatory
