= Kilocore =

Multi-core microprocessor

General information
- Launched: 2006
- Designed by: Rapport, IBM
- Common manufacturer: IBM

Performance
- Max. CPU clock rate: 125 MHz

Physical specifications
- Cores: 256, 1024, 1025

Architecture and classification
- Instruction set: PowerPC

Kilocore was a high-performance, low-power multi-core microprocessor that has 1,025 cores designed by Rapport Inc. and IBM and announced in 2006. Rapport was a California fabless semiconductor company founded in 2001 and dissolved in 2009.

Kilocore contained a single PowerPC processing core, and 1,024 eight-bit Processing Elements running at 125 MHz each, which could be dynamically reconfigured, connected by a shared interconnect. It allows high performance parallel processing.

Rapport's first product to market was the KC256, with 256 8-bit processing elements. The KC256 started shipping in 2006. The elements were grouped in 16 "stripes" of 16 processing elements each, with each stripe able to be dedicated to a particular task.

The "thousand core" products were planned to be the KC1024 and KC1025, due in 2008. Both would have 1024 8-bit processing elements, in a 32 x 32-stripe configuration. The KC1025 has the PowerPC CPU, while the KC1024 has processing elements only.

IBM said that the Kilocore1025 will enable "streaming live- and high-definition video on a low-power, mobile device at 5 to 10 times the speed of existing processors."

Despite raising an additional $18.5 million in 2008, the company dissolved before Kilocore came to market.
