= IBM RAD6000 =

Radiation-hardened computer

RAD6000
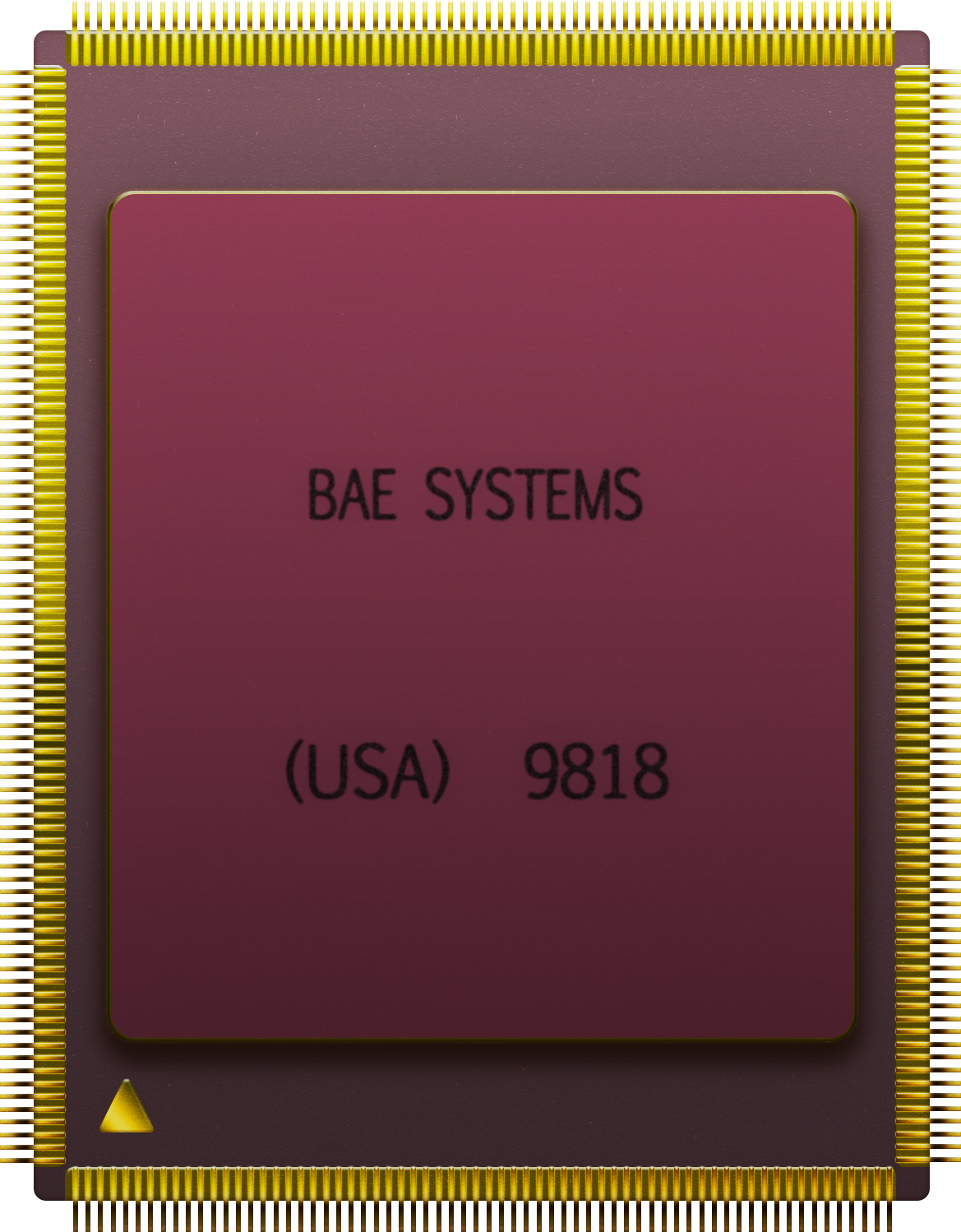
- The RAD6000 processor

General information
- Launched: 1995
- Marketed by: BAE Systems
- Designed by: IBM
- Common manufacturer: BAE Systems

Performance
- Max. CPU clock rate: 2.5 MHz to 66 MHz

Physical specifications
- Cores: 1

Cache
- L1 cache: 8 KB

Architecture and classification
- Application: Radiation hardened for use in spacecraft
- Technology node: 0.5 μm
- Instruction set: POWER1

History
- Successor: RAD750

The RAD6000 radiation-hardened single-board computer, based on the IBM RISC Single Chip CPU, was manufactured by IBM Federal Systems. IBM Federal Systems was sold to Loral, and by way of acquisition, ended up with Lockheed Martin and is currently a part of BAE Systems Electronic Systems. RAD6000 is mainly known as the onboard computer of numerous NASA spacecraft.

== History ==
The radiation-hardening of the original RSC 1.1 million-transistor processor to make the RAD6000's CPU was done by IBM Federal Systems Division working with the Air Force Research Laboratory.

As of June 2008, there are 200 RAD6000 processors in space on a variety of NASA, United States Department of Defense and commercial spacecraft, including:

- Mars Exploration Rovers (Spirit and Opportunity)
- Deep Space 1 probe
- Mars Polar Lander and Mars Climate Orbiter
- Mars Odyssey orbiter
- Spitzer Infrared Telescope Facility
- MESSENGER probe to Mercury
- STEREO Spacecraft
- IMAGE/Explorer 78 MIDEX spacecraft
- Genesis and Stardust sample return missions
- Phoenix Mars Polar Lander
- Dawn Mission to the asteroid belt using ion propulsion
- Solar Dynamics Observatory, Launched Feb 11, 2010 (flying both RAD6000 and RAD750)
- Burst Alert Telescope Image Processor on board the Swift Gamma-Ray Burst Mission
- DSCOVR Deep Space Climate Observatory spacecraft

The computer has a maximum clock rate of 33 MHz and a processing speed of about 35 MIPS. In addition to the CPU itself, the RAD6000 has 128 MB of ECC RAM. A typical real-time operating system running on NASA's RAD6000 installations is VxWorks. The Flight boards in the above systems have switchable clock rates of 2.5, 5, 10, or 20 MHz.

Reported to have a unit cost somewhere between US$200,000 and US$300,000, RAD6000 computers were released for sale in the general commercial market in 1996.

The RAD6000's successor is the RAD750 processor, based on IBM's PowerPC 750.

== See also ==
- IBM RS/6000
- PowerPC 601, a consumer chip with similar computing capabilities to the RAD6000
