= Data Path Acceleration Architecture =

The QorIQ Data Path Acceleration Architecture or QorIQ DPAA is an architecture which integrates aspects of packet processing in the SoC, thereby addressing issues and requirements resulting from the multicore nature of QorIQ SoCs. The DPAA includes Cores, Network and packet I/O as well as hardware offload accelerators.

The DPAA can be used to address various performance related requirements, especially those created by the high speed network I/O found on multicore SoCs such as the P4080.
