= PowerPC e600 =

Family of 32-bit microprocessor cores

The PowerPC e600 is a family of 32-bit PowerPC microprocessor cores developed by Freescale for primary use in high performance system-on-a-chip (SoC) designs with speed ranging over 2 GHz, thus making them ideal for high performance routing and telecommunications applications. The e600 is the continuation of the PowerPC 74xx design.

The e600 is a superscalar out-of-order RISC core with 32/32 KB L1 data/instruction caches, a seven-stage, three-issue pipeline with load/store, system register, powerful branch prediction, integer unit, a double precision FPU and an enhanced 128-bit AltiVec unit with limited out-of-order execution. The core is designed to work in multiprocessing and multi core designs and can take large amounts of L2 caches on die.

The e600 core is completely backwards compatible with the PowerPC 74xx cores from which it derives.

== CPUs ==
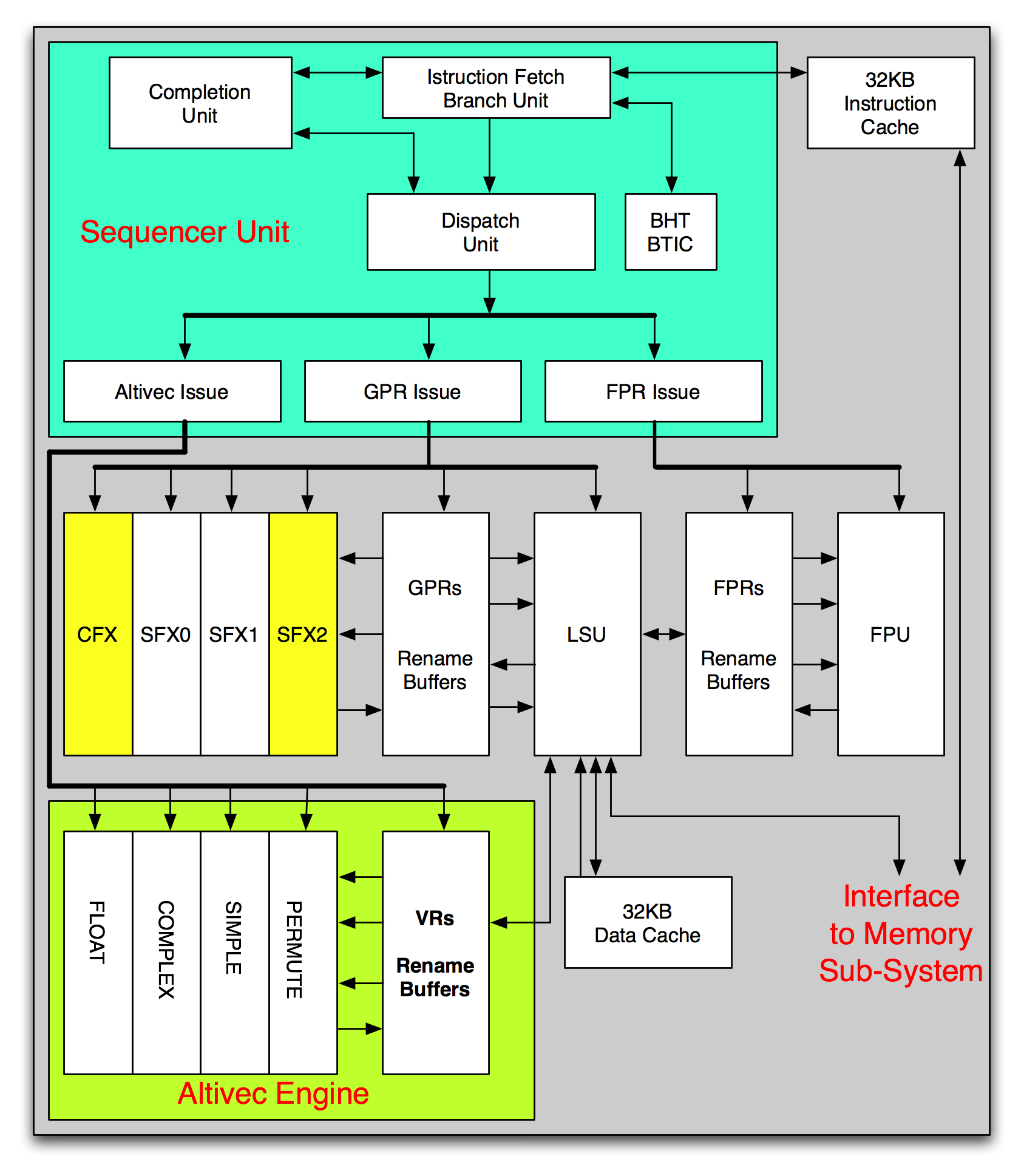
The e600 core design

In August 2004, Freescale (a spin-off of Motorola) announced that it was changing focus from general CPUs to high end embedded SoC devices. In September that year, it introduced a new naming scheme for its PowerPC microprocessor cores, MPC86xx. The 7448 was to be the last pure 74xx and it formed the base of the new e600 core.

=== MPC7448 ===
The 7448 is an evolution of the PowerPC 7447 and is essentially a faster (up to 2 GHz) and more power-efficient version of the 7447B manufactured in 90 nm with 1 MB L2 cache and up to 200 MHz front side bus. It features Freescale's new standard core, the e600.

- Freescale's MPC7448 page

=== MPC864x ===
The problems associated with the bandwidth-constrained external MPX bus interface found on the 74xx series are relieved with single (MPC8641) or dual (MPC8641D) e600 cores, faster system interface via RapidIO, dual x8 PCI Express and an on-die 667 MHz MPX interconnect between I/O, the cores, and dual 64-bit DDR2-memory controllers (with ECC). The product also features four on-chip Gigabit Ethernet controllers with TCP/UDP offloading features. The dual core MPC8641D has support for asymmetric multiprocessing, which enables two operating systems to run on the same device simultaneously, sharing resources but largely unaware of each other.

The MPC8641 (single core) and MPC8641D (dual core) are manufactured on a 90 nm SOI based process. 8641 draws less than 16W at 1.33 GHz and 8641D less than 25W at 1.5 GHz.

- Freescale's MPC8641D page

Introduced in summer of 2008, the MPC8640 and MPC8640D are low power, low cost versions of the MPC8641 parts. Clocked at 1-1.25 GHz they draw 14-21W power while being identical to their older brethren in other respects.

- Freescale's MPC8640D page

=== MPC8610 ===
Introduced in 2007 the MPC8610 is a host processor with integrated graphics processor supporting 24-bit screens sizes up to 1280x1024 pixels. It is a single core CPU with 256 kB on die L2 cache. Manufactured on a 90 nm process, it reaches speeds from 667 to 1333 MHz.

- Press release regarding MPC8610

== Device list ==
This list is a complete list of known core e600 based designs (excluding older 74xx designs). The pictures are illustrations and not to scale.

Name	Image	Fab	Transistors	Die size	Cores	Clock	L2 cache	L3 cache	Package	Introduced
MPC7448		90 nm SOI	90 M	58.44 mm^{2}	1	1000–1700 MHz	1024 kB	n/a	360 pin CBGA; 360pin CLGA	2005
MPC8641D; MPC8641		90 nm SOI	225 M	177.87 mm^{2}	2; 1	1000–1500 MHz	2× 1024 kB; 1× 1024 kB	n/a	1023 pin CBGA	2007
MPC8610		90 nm SOI		82.45 mm^{2}	1	667–1333 MHz	256 kB	n/a	783 pin PBGA	2008
MPC8640D; MPC8640		90 nm SOI	225 M	177.87 mm^{2}	2; 1	1000–1250 MHz	2× 1024 kB; 1× 1024 kB	n/a	1023 pin CBGA	2008
