= Freescale Semiconductor =

Former American semiconductor company

Freescale Semiconductor, Inc.
- Type: Public
- Industry: Semiconductors
- Founded: 2004; 22 years ago
- Defunct: December 7, 2015; 10 years ago
- Fate: Merged
- Successor: NXP Semiconductors
- Headquarters: Austin, Texas, United States
- Key people: Greg Lowe, CEO
- Revenue: ▲$4.186 billion (2013)
- Operating income: ▲$531 million (2013)
- Net income: ▼-$208 million (2013)
- Number of employees: 16,800 (2013)
- Website: freescale.com at the Wayback Machine (archived 2015-06-29)

Freescale Semiconductor, Inc. was an American semiconductor manufacturer. It was created by the divestiture of the Semiconductor Products Sector of Motorola in 2004. Freescale focused their integrated circuit products on the automotive, embedded and communications markets. It was bought by a private investor group in 2006, and subsequently merged with NXP Semiconductors in 2015.

== History ==
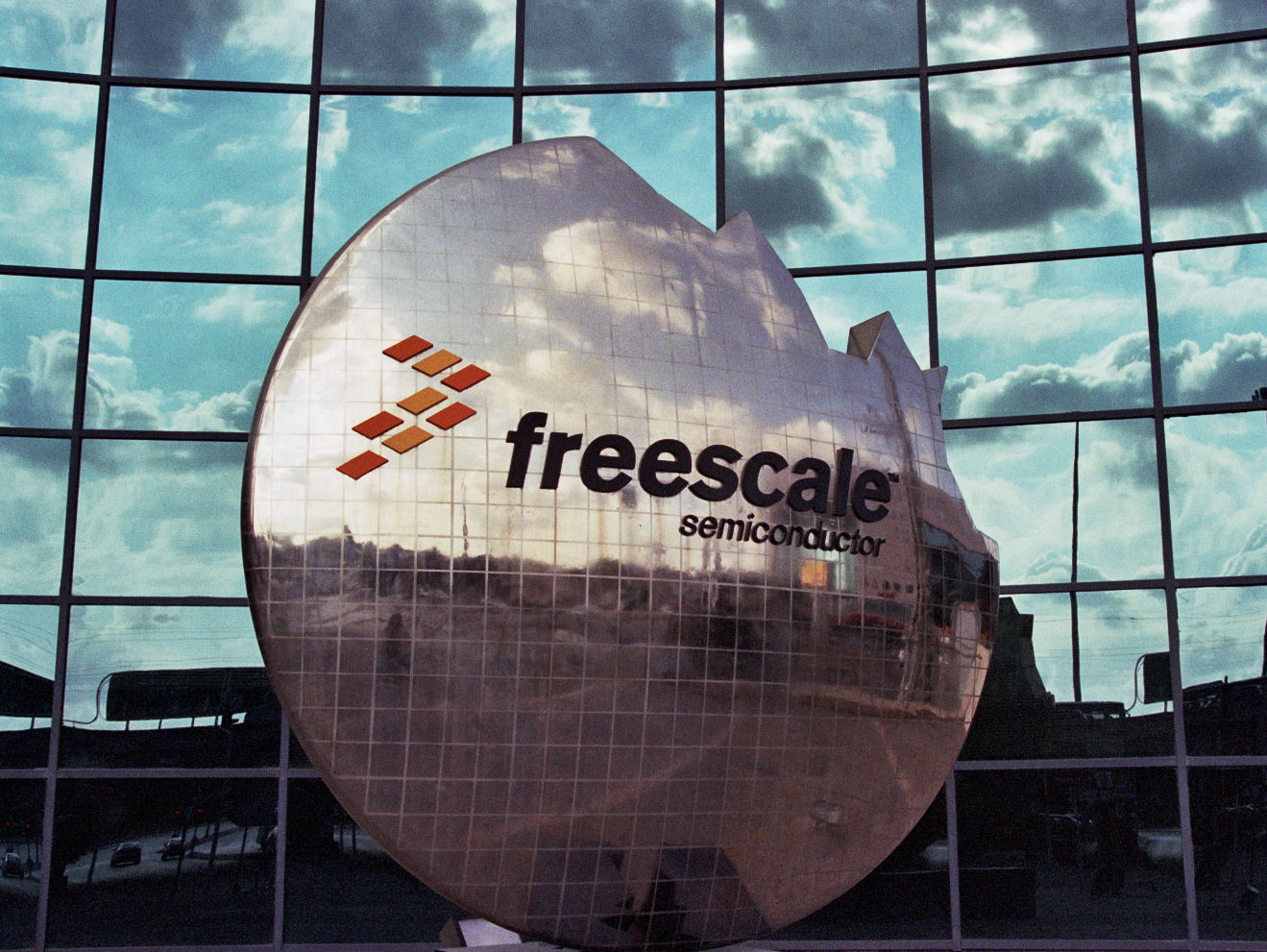
Freescale Semiconductor logo until 2011

=== Divestiture from Motorola and first IPO ===
As of 2003, Motorola Semiconductor Products Sector earned US$5.0 billion in semiconductor sales in 2002 (out of US$27 billion sales for all of Motorola).

Motorola announced that its semiconductor division would be divested on October 6, 2003, and would have a temporary name SPS Spinco.

Freescale completed its Initial public offering (IPO) on July 16, 2004, at a price of US$13. In its announcement, it estimated the stock price to be US$17.50- 19.50 but following a cooling of the market towards tech stocks, it lowered its price to US$13. Existing shareholders of Motorola stock received 0.110415 shares of Freescale stock for every share of Motorola stock as a dividend which was distributed on December 2, 2004.

=== Buyout ===
On September 15, 2006, Freescale agreed to accept a buyout for the sum of $17.6 billion ($40 per share) by a consortium led by the Blackstone Group. Share prices of $13 at the July 2004 IPO had risen to $39.35 in afterhours trading that Friday when the news, rumored that week, broke. A special shareholders meeting on November 13, 2006, voted to accept the buyout offer. The purchase, which closed on December 1, 2006, is reportedly the largest private buyout of a technology company and one of the ten largest buyouts of all time.

=== Second IPO ===
Freescale filed to go public again on February 11, 2011, and completed its IPO on May 26, 2011. Freescale was traded on the New York Stock Exchange under the ticker symbol FSL. At the time of the IPO, the company had $7.6 billion in outstanding debt on its books, and the company was investigated for misconduct related to this IPO.

=== MH370 ===
On March 8, 2014, Freescale announced that 20 of its employees were lost aboard Malaysia Airlines Flight 370.

=== Merger ===
A merger agreement with NXP Semiconductors was announced in March 2015, to form a US$40 (equivalent to $54.33 in 2025) billion company. The acquisition closed on December 7, 2015.

== Products ==
=== Automotive ===
A MEMS-based satellite accelerometer, an Airbag System Basis Chip as well as a dual-axis SPI inertial sensor designed for use with the PSI5 open standard airbag systems were announced in 2011. A microcontroller meant to be used in anti-lock braking systems as well as electronic power steering applications was released in 2008. Freescale also produced pressure sensors for engine management systems.

Freescale's SMARTMOS analog portfolio provides power actuation and multiple switch detect interface family ICs and system basis chips for hybrid vehicles.

In November 2008 Freescale announced that the company would collaborate with McLaren Electronic Systems to further develop its KERS system for McLaren's Formula One car from 2010 onwards. Both parties believed this collaboration would improve McLaren's KERS system and help the system filter down to road car technology.

=== Other business units ===
Besides the MSG (Micro-controller Solutions Group), Freescale's other major semiconductor businesses are the NMG (Networking and Multimedia Group) as well as RASG (RF, Analog and Sensors Group). Freescale, under the guidance of IBM, had also been a source of PowerPC microprocessors (ICs) for Apple Computer's PowerBooks and Mac mini products until the Mac transition to Intel processors in 2006. They joined Power.org in 2006 as a founding member to develop and promote the use of Power Architecture.

DragonBall is a low power derivation of the earlier Motorola 68000 family microprocessors. Freescale also has a portfolio of Digital Signal Processor (DSP) products based on StarCore Technology. Freescale's DSPs are being used in Broadband Wireless, Voice Over IP and video infrastructure systems.

== Litigation ==
Freescale was sued by Marvell Semiconductor for infringing seven patents. The case was settled in 2015.

Freescale lost a patent infringement lawsuit filed by Tessera Corporation and was forced to pay an undisclosed amount as part of the settlement.

== See also ==
- Everspin Technologies - MRAM spinoff
- ON Semiconductor, another Motorola semiconductor spinoff
- List of Freescale products
