= List of router and firewall distributions =

This is a list of router and firewall distributions, which are operating systems designed for use as routers and/or firewalls.

Name	Status	Type	Architecture	Min hardware requirements	License	Cost	Description
Alpine Linux	Active	Linux distribution	x86, x86-64, ARM		Open source	Free	Runs from RAM drive. Original target was small appliances like routers, VPN gateways, or embedded x86 devices. Supports hosting other Linux guest OSes, under LXC control. Uses Busybox and musl.
ClearOS	Discontinued	Red Hat Enterprise Linux derivative	x86, x86-64		GPL and others	Free or paid registration	Router and firewall for SMBs with network, gateway and server modules accessed via WebConfig. Paid registration for extra online services available, but unneeded to operate product.
Cumulus Linux	Discontinued	Debian derivative	?			Free with registration, or paid subscription.	Open source networking operating system for bare metal switches.
DD-WRT	Active	Linux distribution	MIPS, x86, ARM		?	Free or paid registration for x86	Is embedded firmware, available for variety of wireless routers.
Endian Firewall	Active	Linux distribution	x86-64		?	Free (PC) or hardware version	UTM distribution with routing, firewall, anti-spam and anti-virus for web, FTP and e-mail, OpenVPN, IPsec, captive portal functions, and captive portal (missing in community version). Endian Firewall Community (EFW) is a complete version for x86. The anti-virus for EFW is Sophos or ClamAV. The intrusion protection is Snort.
fli4l	Active	Linux distribution	x86, x86-64		GPL (Free software)	Free	Router project supporting a large set of layer-1 technologies (e.g., Ethernet LAN, Wireless LAN, ISDN, DSL, UMTS), layer-3 protocols and functions (IPv4, IPv6, stateful packet filter), and various network-related functions (e.g., Bridging, Bonding, VLANs; DNS, DHCPv4, DHCPv6, IPv6 RA; PPP (client+server), PPTP (client+server), Multilink PPP, OpenVPN, 6in4 tunneling; support for various DynDNS clients, NTP time synchronization). Easily extendable via many added packages.
floppyfw	Unmaintained	Linux distribution	x86		?	Free	Single-floppy router with advanced Linux firewall abilities.
FRRouting	Active					GPL2	Free Range Routing or FRRouting or FRR is a network routing software suite running on Unix-like platforms, particularly Linux, Solaris, OpenBSD, FreeBSD, and NetBSD.
Gargoyle	Active	Linux distribution	MIPS, x86-64				Free OpenWrt-based, for a range of Broadcom and Atheros chipset based wireless routers.
Global Technology Associates, Inc.	Discontinued	FreeBSD derivative	x86		?	Free (limited functions) or paid	GB-OS firewall and UTM appliance.
IPFire	Active	Linux distribution	x86, x86-64, ARM	RAM : 1 GB; Storage : 4 GB	GPLv3	Free	Hardened, open source, mainly performs as router and firewall; a standalone firewall system with a web-based management console for configuring.
Kerio Control	Active	Linux	x86-64		Proprietary	Paid hardware or virtual appliance	For router, firewall.
LEAF Project	Active	Linux distribution	x86		GPLv2, MIT	Free	linux Embedded Appliance Framework; a customizable embedded Linux network appliance used as an Internet gateway, router, firewall, and wireless access point.
LibreCMC	Active	Linux-libre	MIPS		GPLv2	Free	Linux-libre distribution for computers with minimal resources, such as the Ben NanoNote, ath9k-based Wi-Fi routers, and other hardware with emphasis on free software. Based on OpenWrt, the project's goal is to aim for compliance with the GNU Free System Distribution Guidelines (GNU FSDG) and ensure that the project continues to meet these requirements set forth by the Free Software Foundation (FSF). LibreCMC does not support ac (Wi-Fi 5) or ax (Wi-Fi 6) due to a lack of free chipsets.
m0n0wall	Discontinued	FreeBSD derivative	x86		?	Free	Development ended 2015-02-15. Small web-administrative router/firewall/VPN (IPsec/PPTP only; no OpenVPN) distribution. m0n0wall was forked to smallwall.org shortly after Manuel Kasper announced end of development for m0n0wall.
Openwall	Active	Linux	x86, x86-64		?	Free	GNU/*/Linux (or Owl for short) is a small security-enhanced Linux distribution for servers, appliances, and virtual appliances. Effectively at end of life.
OpenWrt	Active	Linux	x86, x86-64, MIPS, ARM, PowerPC, AVR32, CRIS, m68k, SPARC, SuperH, Ubicom32, etc.		GPL V2	Free	Linux distribution with a focus on CPE-routers and similar embedded devices. Its comprehensive build system is based on a heavily modified uClibc-ng and suitable for embedded systems in general.
OPNsense	Active	FreeBSD derivative, fork of pfSense	x86-64		FreeBSD License	Free or paid	Forward caching proxy, traffic shaping, intrusion detection, two-factor authentication, IPsec and OpenVPN
pfSense	Active	FreeBSD derivative, fork of m0n0wall	x86-64, ARM		Closed & Open source licenses	Free as PfSense CE or paid on Netgate Devices as PfSense Plus	Customized distribution tailored for use as a firewall, router, DHCP server, gateway, OpenVPN, IPsec, proxy and anti-virus (Snort).
Smoothwall	Active (Closed Source)	Linux distribution	x86		Closed & Open source licenses	Free or paid	Router/firewall distribution with a web interface and light terminal.
Sophos	Active	Linux derivative	x86-64		?	Free, Paid or hardware/virtual appliance	UTM - offers free home use for up to 50 clients. Provides HTTP/S web filtering, spam filtering, antivirus (web and email), VPN (PPTP and a HTML5 agentless VPN) and Point-to-point links between UTM and other devices via IPSec and SSL-VPN. Formerly Astaro Security Gateway.
Tomato Firmware	Active	Linux distribution	Broadcom only: MIPS, ARM		GPL V3	Free	Free HyperWRT-based, Linux core firmware distribution for many Broadcom-based wireless routers, originally Linksys WRT54G. Ported to ARM-based consumer routers. Now active under the FreshTomato Fork
Vyatta	Discontinued	Linux distribution	x86, x86-64		?	Paid	Enterprise-class router, firewall, VPN, intrusion protection and more delivered as a complete network operating system that runs on x86 hardware or in XenServer, VMware or Hyper-V to provide vFirewall, vRouter network virtualizing functions.
VyOS	Active	Linux distribution	x86, x86-64	RAM : 512MB; Storage : 2GB (recommended)	GPL v2	Free "snapshot" builds or self-compiled. Stable builds require subscription	Based on Vyatta. After Brocade ended development of Vyatta CE (free edition) in favor of the subscription edition, this project aims to keep open source development going. But has changed to paid subscription model too.
Windows RRAS	Active	Windows add-in feature	x86, x86-64		?	Requires prerequisite Windows OS license	Windows Routing and Remote Access Service is a feature that can be installed on Windows (mainly server) operating systems, and can perform routing functions, NAT, and implement firewall rules.
Zentyal (formerly eBox Platform)	Active	Ubuntu derivative	x86, x86-64		Open source	Free with paid services available	An open-source router, firewall, and small business server.
Zeroshell	Discontinued	Linux distribution	x86, ARM		GPL V2	Free (contribution required for some graphing functions)	Web-administrative router/firewall live CD with QoS features. Can be Wi-Fi access point with advanced features such as the multiple SSID and 802.1x RADIUS authentication; supports VLAN trunking (802.1q), bridging, WAN load balancing, and fail-over features.

== See also ==
- List of open-source routing platforms
- List of router firmware projects
- Comparison of router software projects
