= Efika =

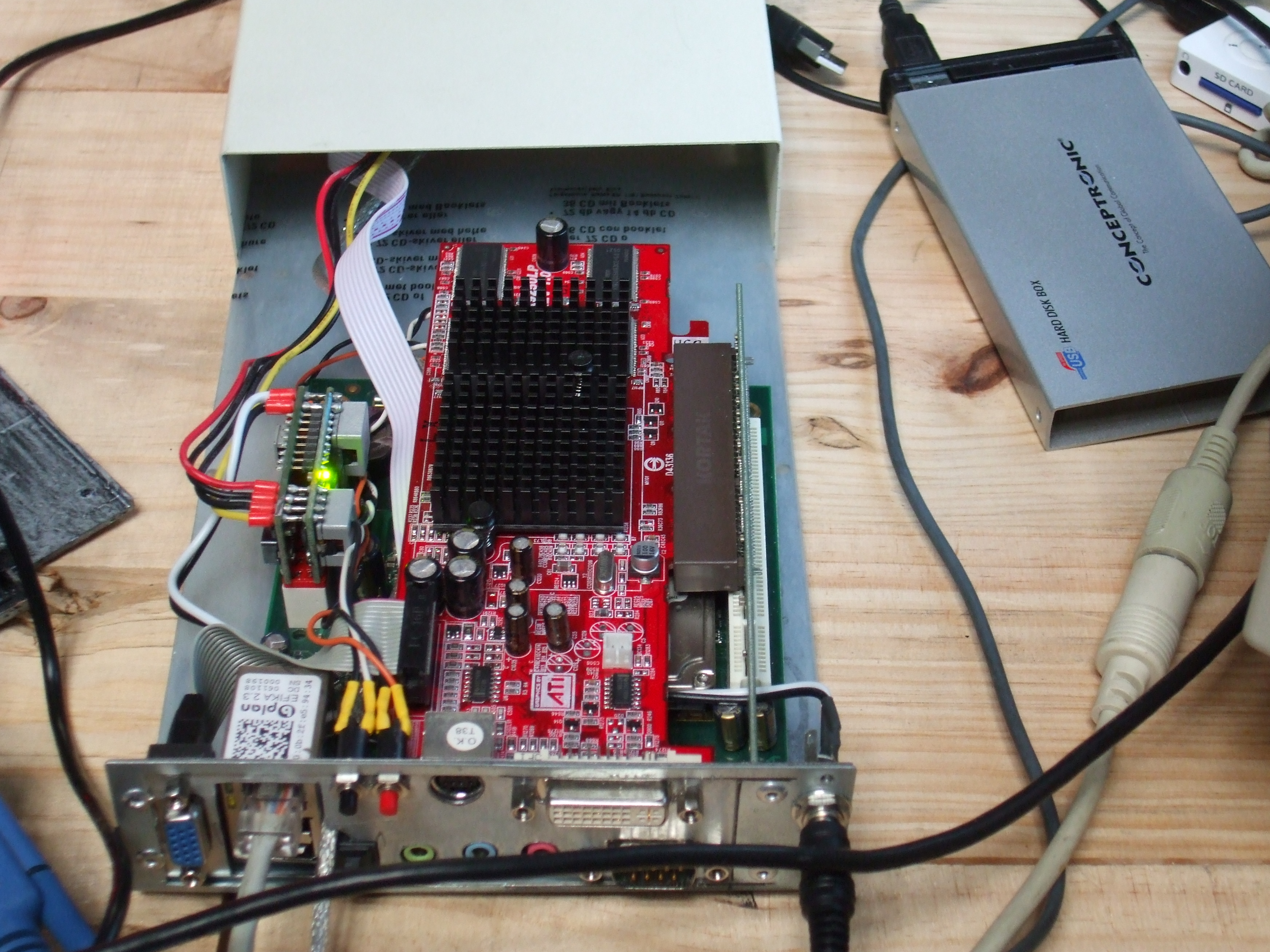
EFIKA 2.3 and ATI Radeon 9250 with 256 MB of 128-bit RAM in 2008

Efika is a line of power efficient ARM architecture and Power ISA based computers manufactured by Genesi.

In Esperanto efika means "efficacious, effective, or efficient".

== EfikaPPC ==
The EfikaPPC, sometimes also referred to as EFIKA 5200B, was based on a 400 MHz Freescale MPC5200B System-on-a-Chip and includes 44-pin 2.5" IDE, USB, serial port, stereo audio in/out, 100 Mbit/s Ethernet, 33/66 MHz PCI port and 128 MB DDR RAM. EFIKA uses an Open Firmware based CHRP compliant firmware with a special x86/BIOS emulator providing support for standard graphics cards on an AGP riser slot. The motherboard had a non-standard form factor, 118 mm × 153 mm × 38 mm small.

Due to its small size, Restriction of Hazardous Substances Directive (RoHS) compliance and energy efficient nature (drawing less than 20 Watts with a harddrive and a graphics card, typically less than 10 Watts during most usage scenarios), the Efika was marketed as environmentally friendly.

An Efika computer could run a variety of operating systems including Linux (Gentoo, openSUSE, Debian and CRUX PPC), MorphOS, AROS, OpenSolaris and QNX. It was sometimes called EFIKA5K2, since it used the PowerPC e300 based MPC5200B processor.

On September 10, 2007, Genesi announced it discontinued the 5200B and was developing a new product based on the Freescale MPC5121e. It would feature on-board PowerVR MBX video.

== Efika MX ==
Efika MX Smartbook
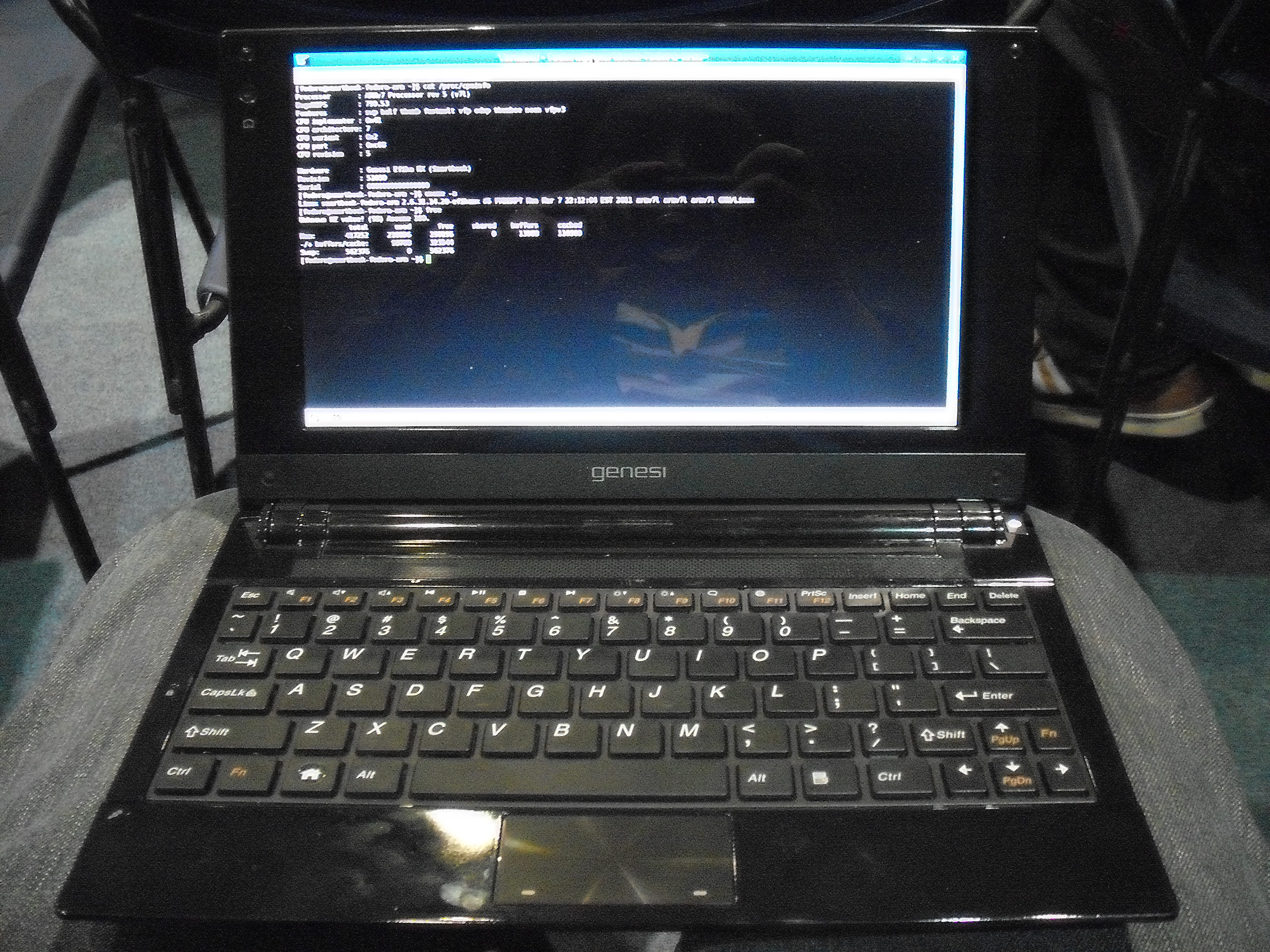
- Smartbook running Fedora 13
- Developer: Genesi
- Manufacturer: Genesi
- CPU: Freescale i.MX515
- Website: genesi-usa.com/products/smartbook

In August 2009, the Efika MX Open Client was announced which used the Freescale i.MX515 ARM system-on-a-chip. The CPU core ran at 800 MHz, Wi-Fi (802.11 b/g/n) and 512 MB of DDR2 SDRAM were included. The Efika MX Smartbook (small laptop computer) was announced in August 2010. It featured a 1024×600 resolution screen, 16 GB of SSD and 512 MB of DDR2 RAM. It required a maximum operating power consumption of 12 watts (average power consumption around 6 W), and came with software based on Ubuntu 10.10 "Maverick Meerkat" release of Linux. Other Linux distributions are known to work properly on the platform. The drivers and software developed specifically for the platform is available on the company public git at GitHub The Open Client product was also renamed the Efika MX Smarttop. In Europe, the Efika MX Smartbook is marketed as Efika MX Netbook due to trademark disputes.

== See also ==
- Pegasos
- Open Desktop Workstation
- mobileGT
