= Qorivva =

Qorivva is a line of Power ISA 2.03-based microcontrollers from Freescale built around one or more PowerPC e200 cores. Within this line are a number of products specifically targeted for functional safety applications. The hardware-based fault detection and correction features found within this line include dual cores that may run in lock-step, full-path ECC, automated self-testing of memory and logic, peripheral redundancy, and monitor/checker cores.

== Qorivva Processor Families ==
Freescale has selected the following families of MPC5xxx processors for inclusion in the program targeting automotive, commercial, industrial, and aerospace applications, wherein assurances of correctness and safety are primary requirements.

=== MPC57xx Family ===
See also MPC57xx.

The MPC57xx Family is intended by its manufacturer to support achievement of system compliance with functional safety standards, ISO 26262 in particular. Freescale's SafeAssure Functional Safety Program includes all members of this family. Within that program, the MPC57xx are the primary microcontrollers targeted for safety-critical automotive applications. Each product in this family features a matched pair of e200 cores intended for primary computation, but also incorporate at least one other e200 core in a support role (e.g., interface coprocessor or "Safety Checker"). To support attainment of higher levels of fault tolerance (such as those expected in the context of ASIL D), the paired e200 cores may be configured to operate as dual lockstep processors. (An exception is MPC5748G whose cores may not be lock-stepped and as such is intended by the manufacturer to only support attainment of the less critical ASIL B.)

Notably, the MPC5777M embodies three e200z7 cores at 300 MHz in a computational shell, two of which may be operated in lock step, and a fourth core, an e200z4, which is used for peripheral control.

Additional built-in hardware mechanisms particular to this family:

- "End to End Error Code Correction" (e2eECC) - all memory storage and internal transfers may be protected by error correction encoding having a Hamming Distance of 4, that distance providing automatic single bit-flip error correction and double bit-flip error detection.
- Built-In Self Tests of Logic and Memory (LBIST and MBIST, respectively) (normally boot-time operations)

=== MPC56xx and MPC55xx Families ===
See also MPC55xx and MPC56xx.

Products in these families each embody one or more e200 cores, usually of different versions. In this family, only the MPC567xK, MPC564xL, and MPC560xP are identified as part of Freescale's Functional Safety Program. Of these, only the MCP5643L features lock-step cores and is the only member of the family explicitly offered in support of ISO 26262.

The MPC5643L is notable for Freescale's claims that it is the first automotive microcontroller to be certified by an independent accredited assessor as compliant with the relevant MCU requirements of the automotive functional safety standard ISO 26262. The Freescale microcontroller MPC5643L has been assessed according to the relevant requirements of ISO 26262 for microcontroller development and verification & validation. The assessment confirmed that the controller meets ASIL D.

== See also ==
- PowerPC e200
- Hercules (microcontroller), another microcontroller designed for functional safety
- Infineon AURIX, another microcontroller designed for functional safety
- V850 CPU, the successor to the NEC V60, microcontroller used in automotive safety
- ARM Cortex-R, another microcontroller designed for safety-critical applications
