= Hercules (microcontroller) =

Line of safety microcontrollers from Texas Instruments

ARM architectures
- The ARM logo
- Designer: ARM Holdings

32-bit architectures (Cortex)
- Version: ARMv8-R, ARMv7-A, ARMv7-R, ARMv7E-M, ARMv7-M, ARMv6-M
- Encoding: 32-bit except Thumb2 extensions use mixed 16- and 32-bit instructions.
- Endianness: Bi (Little as default)
- Extensions: Thumb-2 (mandatory since ARMv7), NEON, Jazelle, FPv4-SP

Registers
- General-purpose: 16 x 32-bit integer registers including PC and SP
- Floating-point: Up to 32 × 64-bit registers, SIMD/floating-point (optional)

Hercules is a line of ARM architecture-based microcontroller from Texas Instruments built around one or more ARM Cortex cores. This "Hercules safety microcontroller platform" includes a series of microcontrollers specifically targeted for Functional Safety applications, through such hardware-base fault correction/detection features as dual cores that can run in lock-step, full path ECC, automated self testing of memory and logic, peripheral redundancy, and monitor/checker cores.

This line includes the TMS470M, TMS570 and RM4 families. These families were "designed specifically for IEC 61508 and ISO 26262 safety critical applications". However, they differ significantly in the degree of support for these safety standards:

TMS470

- Value Line Transportation and Safety MCUs
- Supports Safety for
  - IEC 61508 systems

RM4

- High Performance Industrial and Medical Safety MCUs
- Developed to Safety Standards
  - IEC 61508 SIL-3

TMS570

- High Performance Transportation and Safety MCUs
- Developed to Safety Standards
  - IEC 61508 SIL-3
  - ISO 26262 ASIL D

In particular, TMS570 support for ASIL D is accomplished through dual lock-step cores.

== See also ==
- IEC 61508 (Functional Safety Standard)
- ISO 26262 (Automotive Functional Safety Standard)
- Qorivva, a comparable 32-bit PowerPC safety microprocessor line from Freescale
