= MobileGT =

The mobileGT name refers to both a computing platform and an alliance of vendors in the navigation, infotainment and telematics industries. It focuses on automotive, industrial and consumer electronics based on PowerPC and Power ISA processors. The mobileGT Alliance was initiated by Motorola in 2000 and consists today of an array of members from different disciplines like RTOS, middleware, software, graphics, audio, wireless, navigation and development tools. mobileGT solutions can be found in in-car entertainment and informatics systems from many car manufacturers such as BMW, Ford, General Motors, Hyundai and Mercedes-Benz, but can also be found in computing platforms like the EFIKA.

== See also ==
- PowerPC 5000
- PowerQUICC
