= RTAS =

RTAS may refer to:

- Real Time AudioSuite, an audio plug-in format developed by Digidesign
- Run-Time Abstraction Services, a firmware abstraction layer used on some computers
- Rayman: The Animated Series, a 1999 kid's show

ㅇㅇ
