= OPNsense =

Firewall distribution

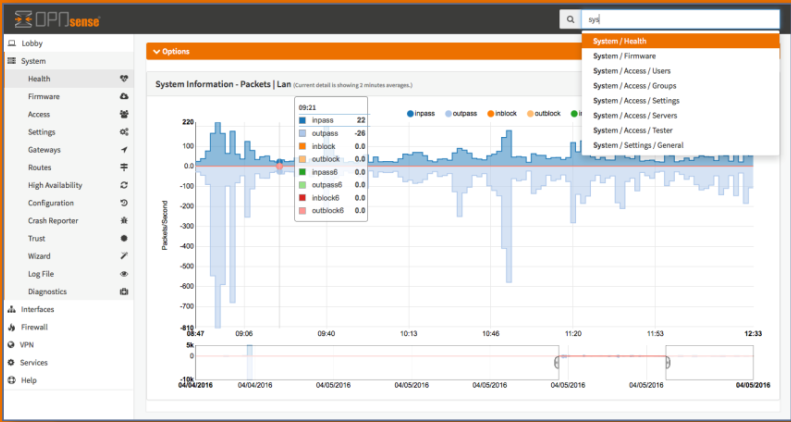
- Developer: Deciso B.V.
- OS family: FreeBSD (15.1-RELEASE)
- Working state: Current
- Source model: Open source
- Initial release: 5 January 2015; 11 years ago
- Latest release: 26.7.9 / 11 November 2026; 6 days ago
- Repository: github.com/opnsense
- Supported platforms: x86-64
- Kernel type: Monolithic kernel
- Influenced by: M0n0wall. pfSense
- License: Simplified BSD / FreeBSD License
- Preceded by: m0n0wall
- Official website: opnsense.org

Support status
- Community & Commercial

OPNsense is an open source, FreeBSD-based firewall and routing software developed by Deciso, a company in the Netherlands that makes hardware and sells support packages for OPNsense.

Launched in 2015, it is a fork of pfSense, which in turn was forked from m0n0wall built on FreeBSD. When m0n0wall closed down in February 2015 its creator, Manuel Kasper, referred its developer community to OPNsense.

== Features ==
OPNsense has a web-based interface and can be used on the x86-64 platform. Along with acting as a firewall, it has traffic shaping, load balancing, captive portal and virtual private network capabilities, and others can be added via plugins.

The software also offers next-generation firewall capabilities utilizing Zenarmor, a NGFW plugin developed by OPNsense partner Sunny Valley Networks.

== Domain dispute ==
In November 2017, a World Intellectual Property Organization panel found that Netgate, the copyright holder of pfSense, used the domain opnsense.com in bad faith to discredit OPNsense, and obligated Netgate to transfer domain ownership to Deciso.

== Releases ==
The OPNsense version naming system consists of year.month. Since the first release took place in January 2015, it was named release 15.1. OPNsense typically uses a 6 month major release cycle with new releases in January and July of each year.

OPNsense Release History
Version	Code name	General availability	Latest minor version	Latest release date	Major changes
15.1	Ascending Albatross	2015-01-05	15.1.12	2015-06-17	Initial release
15.7	Brave Badger	2015-07-02	15.7.25	2016-01-18	Base proxy and IDS support; pfSense config importer; FreeBSD 10.1
16.1	Crafty Coyote	2016-01-28	16.1.18	2016-06-30	Firmware mirror location and crypto selection; IPS; FreeBSD 10.2
16.7	Dancing Dolphin	2016-07-28	16.7.14	2017-01-25	RFC 4638 support (MTU > 1492 in PPPoE); HTTPS proxy support; Active Queue Management (AQM): Controlled delay (CoDel) and FlowQueue-CoDel; Two factor authentication using RFC 6238; HardenedBSD's ASLR implementation; UEFI/GPT boot; FreeBSD 10.3
17.1	Eclectic Eagle	2017-01-31	17.1.11	2017-07-25	PHP 7.0; Lets Encrypt plugin; Pluggable firewall rules; Load Balancer, UPnP, SNMP, IGMP, WOL as plugins; FreeBSD 11
17.7	Free Fox	2017-07-31	17.7.12	2018-01-18	HardenedBSD SafeStack for base applications and selected ports; HardenedBSD procfs hardening; Interface code speedup
18.1	Groovy Gecko	2018-01-29	18.1.13	2018-07-24	Debug kernel support; PHP 7.1; pluggable NAT rules; FreeBSD 11.1
18.7	Happy Hippo	2018-07-31	18.7.10	2019-01-07	Meltdown and Spectre V2 mitigations; Intel NIC driver updates; IDS/IPS application detection rules; FreeBSD 11.2
19.1	Inspiring Iguana	2019-01-31	19.1.10	2019-07-03	Firewall NAT rule logging support; WPAD / PAC and parent proxy support in the web proxy; 2FA via LDAP-TOTP combination; Dnsmasq DNSSEC support; HardenedBSD 11.2
19.7	Jazzy Jaguar	2019-07-17	19.7.10	2020-01-09	PHP 7.2; LibreSSL 2.9; WireGuard plugin; Firewall rule statistics
20.1	Keen Kingfisher	2020-01-30	20.1.9	2020-07-23	Google backup API 2.4.0; LibreSSL 3.0; Support elliptic curve TLS certificate creation; VXLAN support; Support for additional loopback interfaces
20.7	Legendary Lion	2020-07-30	20.7.8	2021-01-19	Basic firewall API support (via additional plugin); Suricata 5; Unbound + DHCPDv4: Properly support expired leases; PHP expand code styling to PSR-12; HardenedBSD 12.1
21.1	Marvelous Meerkat	2021-01-28	21.1.9	2021-07-27	Fix stability and reliability issues with regard to vmx(4), vtnet(4), ixl(4), ix(4) and em(4) Ethernet drivers; LibreSSL 3.2; New and improved live traffic report; IDPS: New policy definition using metadata tags (e.g. drop all critical events aimed at the perimeter)
21.7	Noble Nightingale	2021-07-28	21.7.8	2022-01-27	Migrate bsdinstaller to bsdinstall; AXGBE 10 Gbps network card driver inclusion; PHP 7.4; NTPD client mode; Firmware Update Revamp; Firewall states diagnostic API/GUI
22.1	Observant Owl	2022-01-27	22.1.10	2022-07-07	Authentication / LDAP automatic user creation on login; Improve alias hostname resolve performance; Improved firewall statistics; Support overload table on max new connections; FreeBSD 13
22.7	Powerful Panther	2022-07-28	22.7.11	2023-01-18	Intel QuickAssist (QAT) support; Add stacked VLAN support (IEEE 802.1ad / QinQ); Advanced DDoS protection using syncookies; PHP 8.0; FreeBSD 13.1
23.1	Quintessential Quail	2023-01-13	23.1.11	2023-06-28	Firewall alias BGP ASN type support; DNS insights dashboard; PHP 8.1; WireGuard kernel module; LibreSSL discontinued
23.7	Restless Roadrunner	2023-07-31	23.7.12	2024-01-16	Support for Importing Encrypted Configuration Files During OPNsense Installation; RADIUS Authentication - Add MSCHAPv2 support; Intrusion Detection: Suricata Netmap API version 14 enabled; PHP 8.2; FreeBSD 13.2
24.1	Savvy Shark	2024-01-30	24.1.10_8	2024-07-25	Suricata 7; OpenSSL 3 ports migration; NPTv6 migrate to MVC; VXLAN: add support for non standard port numbers; os-firewall plugin inclusion to ease API usage; Improve WireGuard kernel plugin and implement it in core; Add Kea DHCP server option as an alternative to ISC DHCP which will eventually be deprecated
24.7	Thriving Tiger	2024-07-25	24.7.12	2025-01-15	Python 3.11; FreeBSD 14.1; PHP 8.3; Modern dashboard UI improvements; Several MVC migrations (GIF, GRE, NAT, dhcrelay); WireGuard VPN performance improvements; WireGuard client QR code generation; ISC dhcrelay deprecated; Captive portal fixes and improvements
25.1	Ultimate Unicorn	2025-01-29	25.1.12	2025-07-22	FreeBSD 14.2; PHP 8.3; ZFS snapshot support; Updated UI with new dark theme; Several MVC/API migrations
25.7	Visionary Viper	2025-07-23	25.7.11	2026-01-15	FreeBSD 14.3; Updated firewall automation GUI; Frontend overhaul; Alias performance enhancement; Dnsmasq DHCP support (default DHCP server switched from ISC to Dnsmasq); Kea DHCPv6 support; SFTP backup plugin
26.1	Witty Woodpecker	2026-01-28	26.1.11	2026-07-01	Updated firewall live view UI; Redesigned firewall rules + MVC/API overhaul; Automatic Host Discovery; Improved Dnsmasq IPv6 handling; Suricata 8; Python 3.13
26.7	Xenial Xenops	2026-07-15	26.7.9	2026-11-11	FreeBSD 15.1; OpenVPN 2.7; PHP 8.5; MVC based firewall rules now default; Improved IPv6 support; Dashboard and UI improvements
Legend: No longer supported versions Latest supported release

== See also ==
- List of router and firewall distributions
