= Endian =

Endian may refer to:

- Endianness, the order of the bytes, comprising a digital word, in computer memory
- Endian Firewall, a Linux distribution of the South Tyrolean company Endian

== See also ==
- Big-endians, a fictional group in Gulliver's Travels
