= CAMeL-View TestRig =

CAMeL-View
- Stable release: 9.0 / January, 2025
- Operating system: Windows
- License: BSD
- Website: www.camelview.org

CAMeL-View is a software application, which is used for the model based design of mechatronic systems (multi-body simulation, block diagrams, pneumatic systems, hydraulic systems, general simulation, linear analysis and Hardware-in-the-Loop).

CAMeL-View enables object-oriented model creation of mechatronic systems through the use of graphic blocks. The basic elements of multi-body system dynamics, control technology, hydraulics and hardware connectivity support the modeling process. The user’s proprietary C-Code can also be integrated into the models, which allows CAMeL-View TestRig to be implemented in all phases of the model based design process ( modeling, physical testing and prototyping), and lends itself especially well to mechatronic system design.

The model’s structure is described and displayed with the help of directional connectors. Physical connections (such as mechanical or hydraulic linkages) as well as input and output connections (signal flow) are also available. The input of equations is done via mathematical expressions, e.g. the input of constitutive differential equations in vector and matrix form. Based on the model’s structure, the descriptive equations are converted into non-linear state space representations and converted into executable C-Code.

CAMeL-View supports the simulation process with a configurable “experiment environment” (for simulator and instrumentation components) which allows the user to apply simulation models to supported targets (MPC5200, TriCore, X86, etc.) without the need for additional software tools for Hardware-in-the-Loop applications. In addition, the generation of so-called S-Functions for use in Simulink and the generation of ANSI C-Code for use in stand-alone simulators is also supported.

A particularly noteworthy feature in CAMeL-View TestRig is the way in which the descriptive equations for multi-body system models are created. All multi-body simulation formalisms used for code generation create their equations in the form of typical explicit differential equations (ODE). This is especially important in Hardware-in-the-Loop applications where the calculation of simulation results within a specific, defined time frame must be assured. Only then is it possible to implement complex multi-body simulation models for Hardware-in-the-Loop applications under stringent real-time conditions. These constraints cannot be met when using DAE-based methods.

Additional Toolboxes are available for linear analysis (Eigenvalues, pole-zero analysis, frequency response, etc.) of VRML-based animation.

Development of CAMeL-View began in 1991 in the Paderborn Mechatronic Laboratory of Professor Dr. Ing. J. Lückel. The software was based on predecessors that had been developed there since 1986. The name stands for Computer Aided Mechatronic Laboratory – Virtual Engineering Workbench and describes the basic intent of one of the specific demands placed on development engineers in the computer lab.
