= Common Hardware Reference Platform =

System architecture for PowerPC-based computer systems

Common Hardware Reference Platform (CHRP) is a standard system architecture for PowerPC-based computer systems published jointly by IBM and Apple in 1995. Like its predecessor PReP, it was conceptualized as a design to allow various operating systems to run on an industry standard hardware platform, and specified the use of Open Firmware and RTAS for machine abstraction purposes.

== History ==
Unlike PReP, CHRP incorporated elements of the Power Macintosh architecture and was intended to support the classic Mac OS and NetWare, in addition to the four operating systems that had been ported to PReP at the time (Windows NT, OS/2, Solaris, and AIX).

CHRP did not receive industry-wide adoption, however. The only systems to ship with actual CHRP hardware are certain members of IBM's RS/6000 series running AIX, and small amount of Motorola PowerStack workstations.

Apple had planned to support CHRP with the Copland operating system, and expected Macintosh clone manufacturers to adopt it for their future hardware. However, after their acquisition of NeXT and appointment of Steve Jobs as acting CEO, Apple began to phase out the clone program, and decided against licensing any CHRP-based hardware.

Power.org has a new Power Architecture Platform Reference (PAPR) that provides the foundation for development of Power ISA-based computers running the Linux operating system. The PAPR was released fourth quarter of 2006.

== See also ==
- OpenPIC and IBM MPIC
