= Machine state register =

A machine state register (MSR) is one of three process control registers present in the PowerPC processor architecture.

== Processors ==
The implementation details of the machine state register will vary from model to model. Below are two representative implementations, the 32-bit Freescale e200z3 PowerPC core and the 64-bit IBM PowerPC.

=== e200z3 PowerPC core ===
==== Uses of the machine state register ====
This 32-bit register either controls and/or reports several important processor states.

Mnemonic	Description
UCLE	Enables/disables userspace execution of cache locking instructions
SPE	Enables/disables vector instructions
WE	Enables/disables power management
CE	Enables/disables critical interrupts
EE	Enables/disables external interrupts
PR	Identifies if the processor is in supervisor or user mode
FP	Identifies availability of hardware floating point unit
ME	Enables/disables machine check interrupts
FE0	Sets floating point exception mode
DE	Enable/disable debug interrupts
FE1	Sets floating point exception mode
IS	Sets instruction address space
DS	Sets data address space

==== Reading and writing the machine state register ====
The contents of the register may be read using the move from machine state register (mfmsr) instruction and may be modified by executing the return from interrupt (rfi, rfci, rfdi), system call (sc) and move to machine state register (mtmsr) instructions.

=== PowerPC ===
==== Uses of the machine state register ====
This 64-bit register either controls and/or reports several important processor states.

Mnemonic	Description
SF	Selects 32-bit/64-bit mode
HV	Selects hypervisor state
EE	Enable/disable external interrupts
PR	Selects privileged or problem state
FP	Reports floating-point availability
ME	Enables/disables machine check interrupts
FE0	Select floating-point mode exception mode
SE	Enables/disables single-step tracing
BE	Enables/disables branch tracing
FE1	Select floating-point exception mode
IR	Enable/disable instruction address translation
DR	Enable/disable data address translation
PMM	Performance monitor mark
RI	Lists whether interrupt is (non-) recoverable
LE	Selects Little-Endian or Big-Endian mode (not G5)

==== Reading and writing the machine state register ====
The machine state register can be read using the mfmsr instruction and modified using the mtmsr[d], rfid and hrfid instructions.

== Confusion with model-specific register ==
While the machine state register found in the PowerPC architecture and the model-specific registers found in IA-32 and x86-64 architectures fulfill similar functions and the initialism "MSR" can refer to either, there are important differences that distinguish them. The machine state register, a single register, provides coarse-grained control over a small number of machine functions. In contrast, dozens to hundreds of model-specific registers exist on recent IA-32 and x86_64 architectures and provide a much finer granularity of both reporting and control of machine state. The term "machine state register" does not appear in Intel and AMD documentation; likewise "model-specific register" does not appear in IBM and Freescale documentation.
