= WIMG (disambiguation) =

WIMG is a gospel radio station in Ewing, New Jersey.

WIMG may also refer to:

- WIMG (CPU), an acronym that describes that memory/cache attributes for the PowerPC and Power ISA architectures
- WIMG, the ICAO airport code for Sutan Sjahrir Air Force Base, Padang, Indonesia
