= PfSense =

Firewall/Router software distribution

pfSense
- Version of the FreeBSD operating system

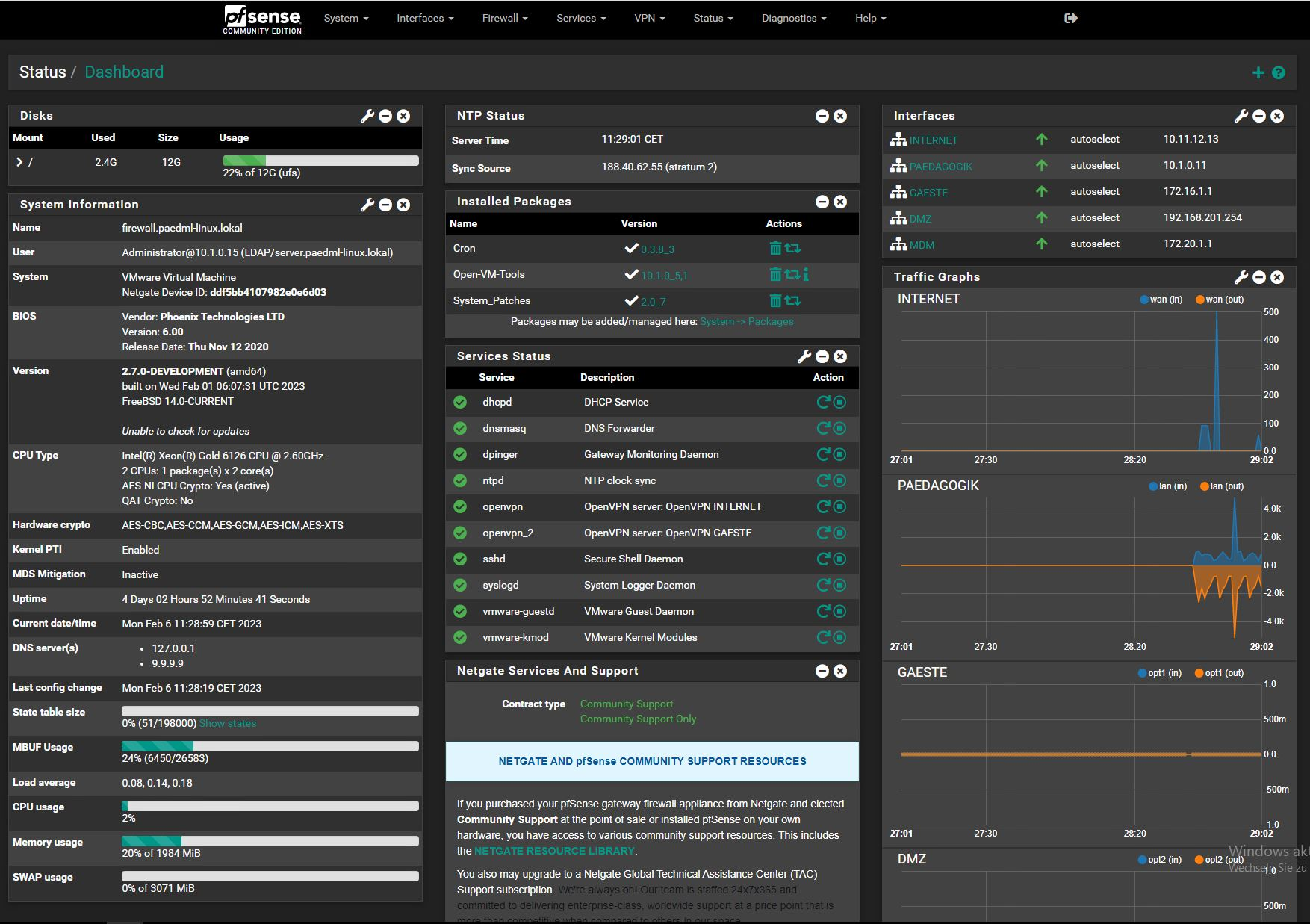
- The main dashboard of pfSense 2.7.0-DEVELOPMENT
- Developer: Rubicon Communications, LLC (Netgate)
- OS family: FreeBSD
- Working state: Current
- Source model: Closed source and open source
- Released to manufacturing: Oct 2006
- Latest release: Community Edition: 2.8.1 (amd64) / September 4, 2025; 7 months ago; Plus: 24.11 / November 25, 2024; 16 months ago
- Repository: github.com/pfsense/pfsense
- Supported platforms: 32-bit (discontinued in 2.4.x); 64-bit Intel / AMD
- Default user interface: Web
- License: Apache License 2.0 (Applies to pfSense CE)
- Preceded by: m0n0wall
- Official website: www.pfsense.org

Support status
- Supported by the community; Paid commercial support

pfSense is a firewall/router computer software distribution based on FreeBSD. The open source pfSense Community Edition (CE) and pfSense Plus is installed on a physical computer or a virtual machine to make a dedicated firewall/router for a network. It can be configured and upgraded through a web-based interface, and requires no knowledge of the underlying FreeBSD system to manage.

== Overview ==
The pfSense project began in 2004 as a fork of the m0n0wall project by Chris Buechler and Scott Ullrich. Its first release was in October 2006. The name derives from the fact that the software uses the packet-filtering tool, PF.

Notable functions of pfSense include traffic shaping, VPNs using IPsec or PPTP, captive portal, stateful firewall, network address translation, 802.1q support for VLANs, and dynamic DNS (DDNS). pfSense can be installed on hardware with an x86-64 processor architecture. It can also be installed on embedded hardware using Compact Flash or SD cards, or as a virtual machine.

== Release cadence and support ==
Since 2021, pfSense Plus editions have followed an annual major version release cadence. The CE version of the software has followed an annual minor version release cadence. Based on their list of unsupported software, pfSense only supports the current and previous version of both the CE and Plus editions.

== OPNsense ==
In January 2015, the OPNsense project was started by forking the version of pfSense at that time.

In November 2017, a World Intellectual Property Organization panel found Netgate, the copyright holder of pfSense, utilized OPNsense' trademarks in bad faith to discredit OPNsense, and obligated Netgate to transfer ownership of a domain name to Deciso.

== WireGuard protocol support ==
In February 2021, pfSense CE 2.5.0 and pfSense Plus 21.02 added support for a kernel WireGuard implementation. Support for WireGuard was temporarily removed in March 2021 after implementation issues were discovered by WireGuard founder Jason Donenfeld. The July 2021 release of pfSense CE 2.5.2 version re-included WireGuard.

== See also ==
- List of router and firewall distributions
