= PowerPC e300 =

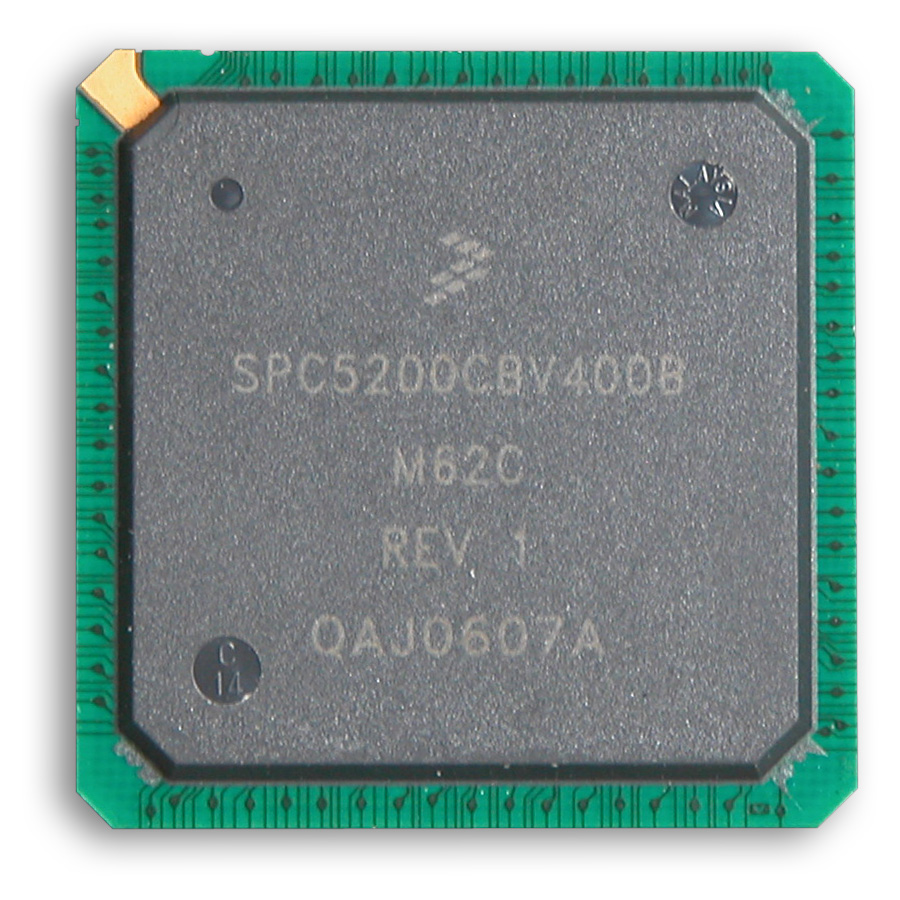
A 400 MHz MPC5200 from an EFIKA computer.

The PowerPC e300 is a family of 32-bit PowerPC microprocessor cores developed by Freescale Semiconductor introduced in 2004. It was designed primarily for system-on-a-chip (SoC) designs with speed ranging up to 800 MHz, thus making them ideal for embedded applications. It was one of the first products released by Freescale, which had formed as a spin-off of Motorola in 2004.

The e300 is a superscalar RISC core with 16/16 or 32/32 kB L1 data/instruction caches, a four-stage pipeline with load/store, system register, branch prediction and integer unit with optional double-precision FPU. The e300 core is completely backwards compatible with the G2 and PowerPC 603e cores from which it derives.

The e300 core is the CPU part of several SoC processors from Freescale:

- The MPC83xx PowerQUICC II Pro family of telecom and network processors.
- The MPC51xx and MPC52xx family of automotive and industrial control processors.
- MSC7120 GPON, optical network processor integrated DSP unit.
