= Power.org =

Defunct global computer industry organization

- Successor: OpenPOWER Foundation
- Formation: 2004
- Dissolved: 2013
- Website: power.org at the Wayback Machine (archived 2008-06-10)

Power.org was a global computer industry organization from 2004 to 2013, then succeeded by OpenPOWER Foundation, to develop and promote POWER Architecture technology by establishing its open standards, guidelines, best practices, and certifications.

It was founded in 2004 by IBM and 15 other companies. Freescale (later bought by NXP Semiconductors) joined in 2006 as an honorary founding member and was given similar status as IBM. One year later, it announced a landmark technology development deal with IBM. Power.org had over 40 paying members as corporations, governmental, and educational institutions.

== History ==
In December 2004, Power.org was founded. In February 2006, Freescale joined. In July 2006, the Power Architecture brand was established to unify products based on Power, PowerPC, PowerQUICC and Cell. In November 2006, Power ISA v2.03 was released as the unified instruction set for POWER Architecture processors, to unify 15 years of development on POWER and PowerPC. In November 2006, Power Architecture Platform Reference was released as the foundation for development of standard Power Architecture computers running the Linux operating system. In September 2007, Power Architecture Developer Conference was held. In December 2008, the Common Debug API Specification was released. In December 2008, the ePAPR specification for embedded systems was released.

Power.org introduced and promoted Power Architecture, a collective marketing term for any specification, hardware, and software related to the POWER, PowerPC, and Power ISA architectures.

In 2013, Power.org was disestablished and succeeded by OpenPOWER Consortium, since renamed OpenPOWER Foundation, which is responsible for developing and releasing open documentation.

== Organization ==
Power.org's board of directors consisted of founding members and others. Several committees and subcommittees governed and managed the organization's goals, projects, and responsibilities. Members had no veto rights in the decision processes of what defined the Power ISA, which was IBM's and Freescale's responsibility. Power.org had a tiered membership model, with four levels: Founder, Sponsor, Participant, Associate and Developer. Developer membership was free of charge. Members included these:

- IBM (founder)
- Freescale (founder, later bought by NXP)
- Cadence (founder)
- Synopsys (founder)
- Airbus
- AMCC
- Barcelona Supercomputing Center
- Broadcom
- Bull
- Chartered
- Curtiss-Wright
- Denali
- ENEA
- Ericsson
- Genesi
- Green Hills Software
- HCL Technologies
- Kyocera
- Lauterbach
- LynuxWorks
- Mentor Graphics
- National Instruments
- OKI
- P.A. Semi
- Rapport
- Sony
- Terra Soft
- Thales Group
- Tundra Semiconductor
- University of Mannheim
- University of Tennessee, Knoxville
- Virage Logic
- Virtutech
- Wind River
- Xilinx
- XGI Technology
