= Floppyfw =

floppyfw
- Developer: Thomas Lundquist
- Working state: Inactive
- Source model: Open source
- Initial release: 2000
- Latest release: 3.0.15 / July 21, 2011
- Available in: English
- Supported platforms: x86
- Kernel type: 2.4.37.9
- License: various
- Official website: www.zelow.no/floppyfw

floppyfw was a Linux distribution running BusyBox to provide a firewall/gateway/router on a single bootable floppy disk, but was later available in CD format.

Reviews concluded that it was a very simple and reliable gateway/firewall that could be established on small to medium-sized networks at low cost and with ease. One independent study concluded that it was the " best possible security provided by a floppy-based firewall" for the repurposing of old, redundant hardware into Linux-based firewalls or routers.

== Requirements ==
- Intel 80386SX or better
- two network interface cards
- 1.44MB floppy drive
- 12MByte of RAM

== Features ==
Floppyfw's features include:

- Access lists
- IP-masquerading (network address translation)
- Connection tracked packet filtering
- Quite advanced routing
- Traffic shaping
- PPPoE
- Very simple packaging system. Is used for editors, PPP, VPN, traffic shaping and whatever comes up
- Logging through klogd/syslogd, both local and remote
- Serial support for console over serial port
- DHCP server and DNS cache for internal networks
