= Power Architecture Platform Reference =

Open computing platform project

Power Architecture Platform Reference (PAPR) is an initiative from Power.org to make a new open computing platform based on Power ISA processors. It follows two previous attempts made in the 1990s, PReP and CHRP.

The PAPR specification provides the foundation for development of standard server computers. Various operating systems like Linux and IBM AIX rely on the PAPR interface to run on Power-based hardware. PAPR is Power.org's move toward what IBM did originally with PReP, in that it defines a common hardware definition and software/firmware platform under a set of requirements. In practice, the PAPR is an extension to the Open Firmware specification.

Since 2013, extensions have been done by the OpenPOWER Foundation, which released a slightly reduced public version of the PAPR standard for running Linux on Power hardware (called LoPAPR) . In 2020, LoPAPR was renamed to Linux on Power Architecture Reference (LoPAR) with the release of a new version.

== Contributing ==
In July 2020, the document sources of LoPAR were released on terms of Apache License 2.0 in OpenPOWER Foundation GitHub account, and are accepting pull requests from the community.

== Compliant boards ==
- IBM JS20/21 — PowerPC 970FX/MP based server blades.
- The IBM System p product line, called IBM Power Systems nowadays.

== Embedded power architecture platform requirements ==
Wind River led the Power.org sub-committee working on an embedded specification known as ePAPR, that was ratified in July 2008. In October 2011, an updated specification was released, the ePAPR v1.1 to clarify and add a new chapter on virtualization. Apart from basic concepts like using a device tree, the ePAPR specification has nothing in common with the variant for servers—for example it defines a completely different set of hypercalls.
