= M0n0wall =

Firewall distribution

m0n0wall
- Developer: Manuel Kasper
- OS family: FreeBSD (8.4-RELEASE)
- Working state: Discontinued / February 15, 2015
- Source model: Open source
- Initial release: 2003
- Latest release: 1.8.1 / January 15, 2014
- Repository: svn.m0n0.ch/wall/
- Kernel type: Monolithic kernel
- License: BSD
- Succeeded by: pfSense, OPNsense
- Official website: m0n0.ch/wall/

m0n0wall is a discontinued embedded firewall distribution of FreeBSD, one of the BSD operating system descendants. It provided a small image which could be put on Compact Flash cards as well as on CD-ROMs and hard disks. It ran on a number of embedded platforms and generic PCs. The PC version could be run with just a Live CD and a floppy disk to store configuration data, or on a single Compact Flash card (with an IDE adapter). This eliminated the need for a hard drive, which reduces noise and heat levels and decreases the risk of system failure through elimination of moving parts found in older hard drives.

On February 15, 2015 Manuel Kasper announced the "m0n0wall project has officially ended. No development will be done anymore, and there will be no further releases," encouraging "all current m0n0wall users to check out OPNsense and contribute if they can."

== Features ==
m0n0wall provided a web-based configuration and used PHP exclusively for the GUI and bootup configuration. Additionally, it adopted a single XML file for configuration parameters.

Some functions of m0n0wall were:

- Stateful packet filter firewall
- IPsec and PPTP VPNs
- Inbound and Outbound Network Address Translation
- Captive portal
- Traffic shaper
- Inbound and Outbound port filtering
- Support for 802.1q compatible VLANs
- Multiple IP addresses on LAN and WAN ports
- IPS

== Hardware ==
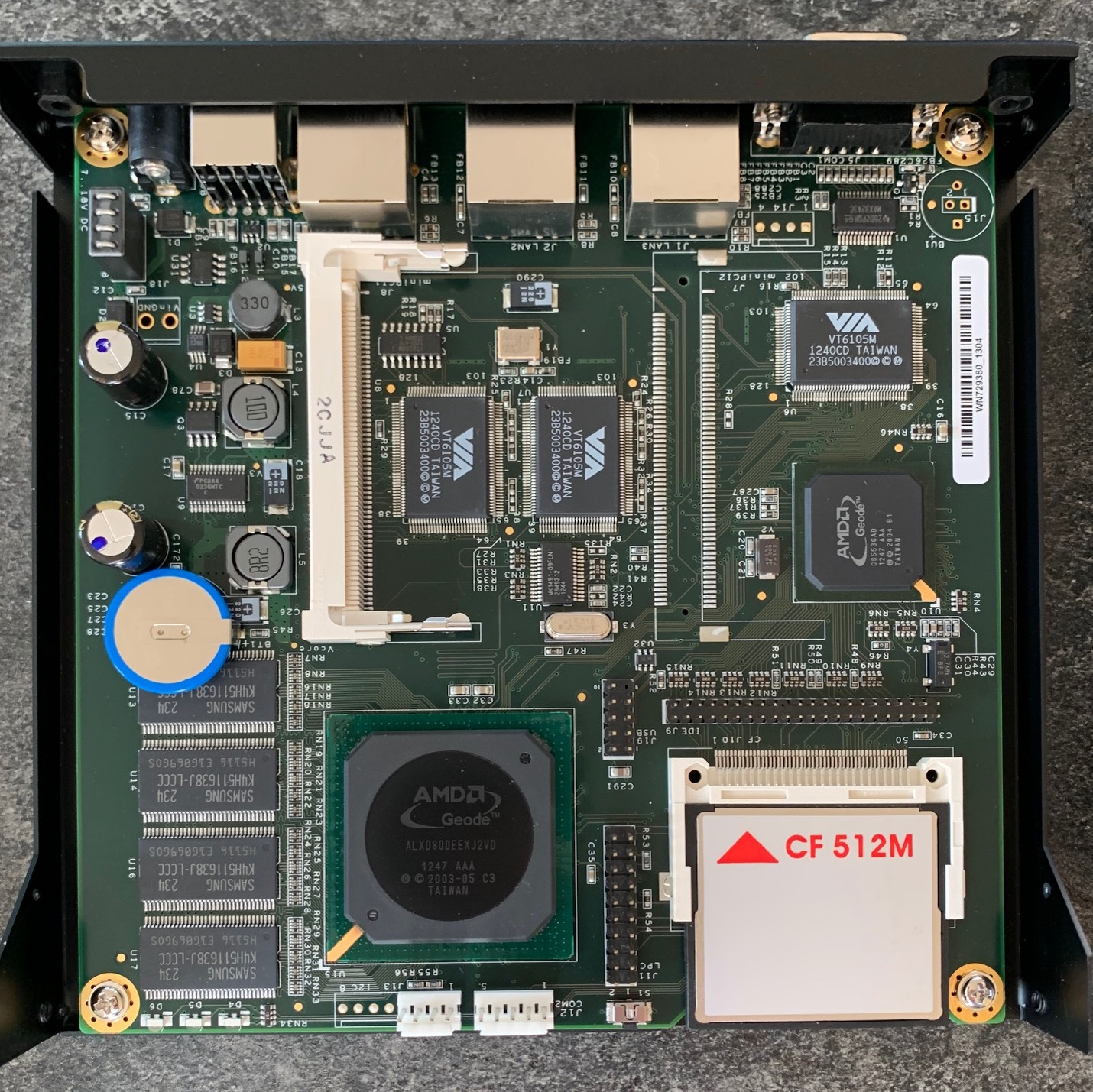
PC Engines ALIX

m0n0wall was installed on embedded hardware designed and manufactured by some companies.

== Derivatives ==
Similar hardware requirements

- t1n1wall: 2015 fork of m0n0wall after it was discontinued, no activity since 2020.
- SmallWall: Another 2015 fork of m0n0wall after its end-of-life, no activity since 2016.
- m0n0wall mod: Original m0n0wall with additional features (DHCP+PPTP, DHCP+PPPoE, static+PPPoE, L2TP, WAN eth interface), no activity since 2013.

Extended hardware requirements

- pfSense: Forked from the m0n0wall project in 2004, first released in 2006.
- OPNsense: Forked from pfSense in 2015.

Other usages (not a firewall)

- AskoziaPBX: An embedded telephone system.
- XigmaNAS: Network-attached storage software using FreeBSD, uses portions of m0n0wall web GUI. Formerly NAS4Free.
- TrueNAS: Network-attached storage software with versions in FreeBSD and Linux. Developed and maintained by iXsystems

== See also ==
- List of router or firewall distributions
