= PowerPC 5000 =

Series of microprocessors

The PowerPC 5000 family is a series of PowerPC and Power ISA microprocessors from Freescale (previously Motorola) and STMicroelectronics designed for automotive and industrial microcontroller and system on a chip (SoC) use. The MPC5000 family consists of two lines (51xx/52xx and 55xx/56xx) that really don't share a common heritage.

== Processors ==
=== MPC51xx ===
- The MGT5100 was introduced in 2002 and Motorola's first CPU for its mobileGT SoC-platform for telematic, information and entertainment applications in cars. Based on the e300 core that stems from the PowerPC 603e, it ran in speeds up to 230 MHz and includes a double precision FPU, 16/16 kB L1 data/instruction caches and a rich set of I/O peripherals like DDR SDRAM, USB, PCI, Ethernet, IrDA and ATA disk controllers.
- The MPC5121e was introduced in May 2007 and is based on the MPC5200B. It is a 400 MHz highly integrated SoC processor targeted for telematics applications and includes controllers for USB, PCI, networking, DDR RAM and disk storage. It also has an on-die PowerVR MBX Lite GPU supporting 3D acceleration and displays up to 1280×720 pixels and a fully programmable 200 MHz RISC co-processor designed for multimedia processing like real-time audio and speech recognition.
- The MPC5123 was introduced in April 2008 and is essentially a MPC5121e without the PowerVR coprocessor. It's designed for telematics, point of sales systems, health care equipment, display kiosks and industrial automation.

=== MPC52xx ===
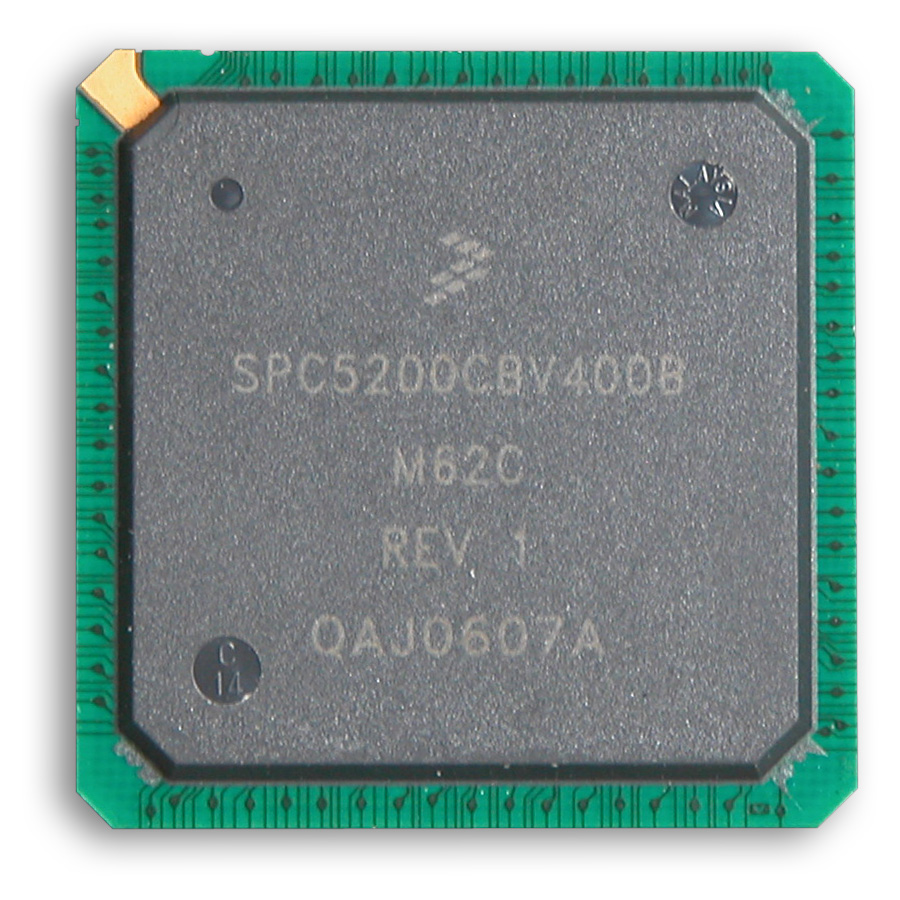
A 400 MHz MPC5200 from an EFIKA

The MPC5200 family is based on the e300 core MGT5100 processor and is also a part of Freescale's mobileGT platform.

- MPC5200 – 266–400 MHz, on-chip controllers for DDR-RAM, PCI, Ethernet, USB, ATA, serial, DMA and other I/O. Introduced in 2003, replaced by the MPC5200B.
- MPC5200B – 266-466 MHz, enhanced MPC5200, introduced in 2005. Also used in the small EFIKA computer.

=== MPC55xx ===
Based on the e200 core that stems from the MPC5xx core, it is upwards-compatible with the newer e500 core and the older PowerPC Book E specification. Focus is on automotive and industrial control systems, like robotics, power train and fuel injection. The cores are the basis for a multitude of SoC controllers ranging from 40 to 600 MHz with a variety of additional functionality, like Flash-ROM, Ethernet controllers, and custom I/O. All MPC55xx processors are compliant with the Power ISA v.2.03 specification.

The MPC55xx family have four slightly different cores from the really low end and to the high end.

- MPC5510 – uses an e200z1 core, with an optional e200z0 core as co-processor.
- MPC5533 and MPC5534 – uses e200z3 cores.
- MPC5553, MPC5554, MPC5561, MPC5565, MPC5566 and MPC5567 – uses e200z6 cores.

=== MPC56xx ===
The MPC56xx family are PowerPC e200 core based microcontrollers jointly developed by Freescale and STMicroelectronics. Built on a 90 nm fabrication process. These microcontrollers are tailor-made for automotive applications like power steering, fuel injection, display control, powertrain, active suspension, chassis control, anti-lock braking systems, and radar for adaptive cruise control. Freescale calls these processors MPC56xx and ST names them SPC56x.

- MPC560xB/C or SPC560B/C – Uses a single e200z0 core at up to 64 MHz, up to 512 kB Flash memory, 64 kB EEPROM, up to 48 kB RAM. Used for automotive body electronics applications.
- MPC560xP or SPC560P – Uses a single e200z0 core at up to 60 MHz, up to 512 kB Flash memory, up to 64 kB EEPROM, up to 40 kB RAM. Used for chassis and airbag control.
- MPC560xS or SPC560S – Uses a single e200z0 core at up to 64 MHz, up to 1 MB Flash memory, 64 kB EEPROM, up to 48 kB RAM, and an on-chip display controller with up to 160 kB VRAM. Used for TFT color display control.
- MPC563xM or SPC563M – Uses a single e200z3 core at up to 80 MHz, up to 1.5 MB Flash memory, up to 111 kB SRAM. Used for entry-level powertrain applications.
- MPC564xL or SPC56EL – Uses dual e200z4 cores at 120 MHz, 1 MB Flash memory, 128 kB SRAM.
- MPC5668G – Uses one e200z6 core and one e200z0 core at up to 128 MHz, up to 2 MB Flash memory, 592 kB SRAM, integrated Ethernet controller.
- MPC5674F – Uses an e200z7 core, up to 264 MHz, up to 4 MB Flash, 256 kB RAM. Used for powertrain, fuel and motor control.

== See also ==
- PowerPC e200
- PowerPC e300
- PowerPC e500
- mobileGT
