= Fli4l =

fli4l
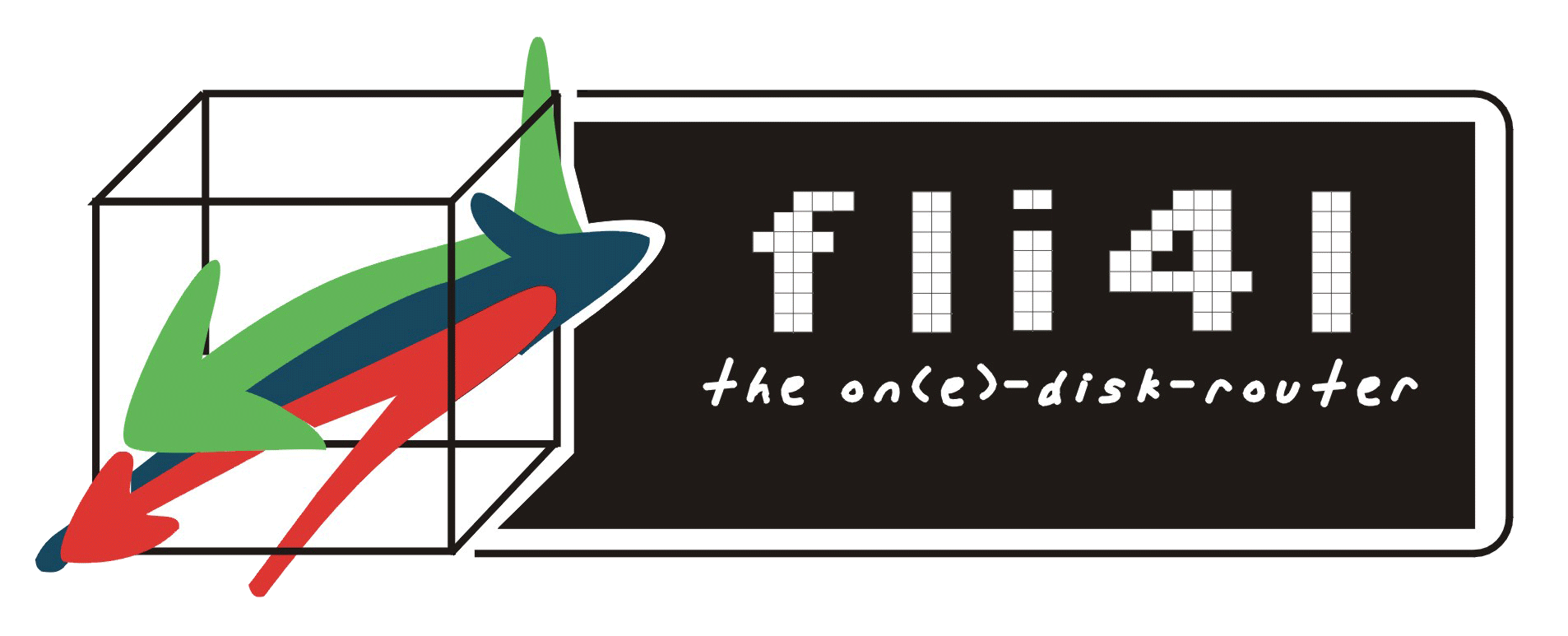
- Developer: fli4l-Team
- OS family: Linux (Unix-like)
- Working state: Current
- Source model: Open source
- Initial release: April 2000 (26 years ago)
- Latest release: 3.10.19 / 2 February 2020 (6 years ago)
- Latest preview: Tarball version / Weekly
- Available in: German, English, French
- Supported platforms: i586, x86-64
- Kernel type: modular
- License: GPL (Free software)
- Official website: www.fli4l.de/en/

fli4l (flexible internet router for linux; previously: floppy isdn for linux) is a Linux distribution, actively developed by German developers since 2000. The projects main task is to provide a small Linux system that turns almost every machine into a router. The distribution can run from a floppy disk and was created with the aim of simple configuration and support for older hardware.

fli4l can route between Ethernet and ISDN, DSL or UMTS, or just between Ethernet networks.

== Characteristics and requirements ==
fli4l is based on the Linux kernel. As the documentation is very extensive no knowledge of Linux is required, however a basic knowledge of network technology is needed.

The hardware requirements for fli4l are low, an Intel Pentium with MMX support and 64 MiB RAM and (depending upon the configuration) one or two network interface controllers is quite adequate. A hard disk drive is not required, but can be used by fli4l too.

Newer versions of fli4l provide also the possibility to create a working installation on a CF card in a card reader, which card then in turn can operate from a CF adapter in an IDE slot. Also the generation of an ISO image is supported to run from a CD-ROM as well as from DOC/DOM for Embedded systems.

fli4l can be configured on Linux, Unix and Windows systems using just text files.

In addition, fli4l has the possibility to encrypt connections over the Internet or via Wireless LAN using OpenVPN or PPTP (Poptop).

== Versions ==
There are two development branches for fli4l, a stable and a development version.

The present stable release is based on a Linux 3.16 kernel and supports virtualization by means of Xen and KVM. USB and Wireless LAN are supported to a great extent as well as current embedded hardware as APU, ALIX, Soekris, and EPIA series.

The 4.0 development version also provides a Linux 4.1 kernel. Furthermore, it implements a new management and configuration layer for connections (so-called circuits) which has been designed from the ground up. It allows to use multiple WAN links (e.g. via DSL, ISDN, or UMTS) in parallel.

== Optional packages ==
fli4l is a modular system using so-called OPT-packages. To create an individual configuration, only software packages for those options, that are needed, are downloaded and unzipped into the directory tree. To extend the basic functionality, a wide range of applications is available in the so-called OPT-database; for example, optional packages can be used for monitoring traffic or an fli4l can function as a printserver. This process easily allows own developments, that can be made available to other users via the OPT-database.

== Device control ==
An fli4l router can be controlled and monitored with a browser-based interface. Besides, the program imonc (isdn monitor client) is available for Windows and Linux (GTK). imonc allows extensive control as well as remote-controlled update of the router's software.
