= Endian Firewall =

Linux distribution

Endian
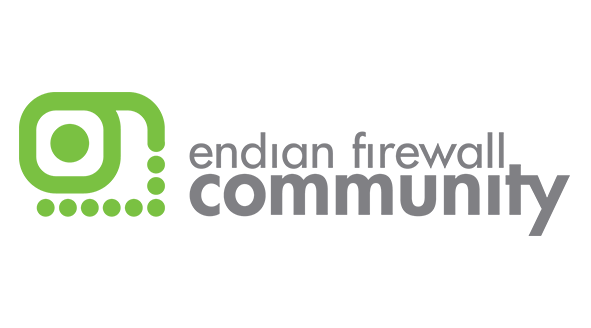
- Endian Firewall Community Logo
- OS family: Linux (Unix-like)
- Working state: Current
- Source model: Open source
- Latest release: 3.3.2 / November 13, 2020; 5 years ago
- Kernel type: Linux 4.4
- Default user interface: Web user interface
- License: Various
- Official website: www.endian.com

Endian Firewall is an open-source router, firewall and gateway security Linux distribution developed by the South Tyrolean company Endian. The product is available as either free software, commercial software with guaranteed support services, or as a hardware appliance (including support services).

== Description ==
Endian Firewall is a Linux security distribution, which is an independent, security management operating system. The system is installed on a PC using a boot CD, and can be operated without a monitor through its online interface or via a keyboard in a command-line interface. The server can be configured via a web interface or the serial interface.

The main task of Endian Firewall is as a gateway, router and firewall, and can act as a proxy for web, email, FTP, SIP and DNS. Up to four different networks (dependent on the number of network cards installed in the host PC) can be managed. Networks are configured through the web interface. With Endian these are differentiated by their color coding:

- Red Network: connection to the insecure Internet.
- Green Network: Secure intranet, e.g. file server.
- Orange Network: Part Safe Demilitarized Zone (DMZ). This includes devices that operate their own server and must be accessible over the Internet, such as Web or FTP servers.
- Blue Network: Secure Wireless part, here on wireless devices can be connected. Thus, they are separated from the green network, which increases its security.

Endian Firewall includes support for load balancing, which means you can add another connection to the Internet from the red network. Endian Firewall then distributes the network load on both network interface controllers.

== License ==
The software is developed by the Italian Endian Spa from Appiano, South Tyrol and a community of volunteer developers. The license model of Endian provides a commercial version and a free version:

- The commercial version can be purchased either as a standalone software (the product is called Endian or simply Endian UTM Software) in order to install them on their own PCs, as well as in the form of finished Out of the Box – firewalls, with special hardware on which the software is preinstalled. There are currently seven hardware variants with different performance and for different network sizes: Mini 25, Mercury 50, Mercury 100, Macro 250, Macro 500, Macro 1000 and Macro 2500.
- Both the free Endian Firewall Community and the commercial Endian UTM Software are tailored for installation on your own hardware. The Endian Firewall Community is licensed under the GPL and is therefore open source software that can be downloaded for free. The community version does not include support and not all the features of the commercial version are available.

== Features ==
The current version includes the following key features:

=== Gateway ===
- Ethernet support
- Traffic Shaping and Quality of service
- Multiple uplinks
- Uplink Failover

=== Firewall & Security ===
- Firewall (both directions)
- Demilitarized Zone
- Intrusion Detection System / Intrusion Prevention System
- Web-, FTP- and E-Mail-antivirus
- Antispam
- Content Filter
- HTTPS- Web interface
- SSH- Access and Forwarding
- Scheduler for automated backups

=== Server Services ===
- Transparent HTTP, HTTPS, FTP, SMTP and POP3-Proxy server
- Caching DNS-Server
- DHCP-server (separately for the green, blue and orange network)
- Network Address Translation
- Virtual Private Network (VPN) Gateway with OpenVPN or IPsec
- NTP-Server
- Policy-Based Routing (port, MAC address, protocol or port)
- Generic SNMP support
- VLAN support (IEEE 802.1Q trunking)

=== User Management ===
- Local
- RADIUS
- LDAP(s)
- Active Directory
- NTLM Single Sign-On
- User or group as HTTP proxy content filter rules

=== Logging & Monitoring ===
- Visualized Live Log Viewer (AJAX based), see figure "The web interface of Endian Firewall"
- Log the activities and the stress of network and hardware
- Connection statistics
- Forwarding possibility of logs to an external syslog server
- ntopng integration
- Event-based notifications by e-mail

=== Others ===
- Support Software-RAID

== History and compared to the original ==
Endian Firewall is a fork of the Linux firewall IPCop, which in turn is a fork of SmoothWall. Due to numerous further developments, only one-fifth of the original IPCop code is used. Newer versions have been based initially on Linux From Scratch and from version 2.2 to RHEL, or on CentOS. With the upcoming version 3.0, Endian Firewall is virtually "Smoothwall-" and "IPCop-free".

The greatest difference from IPCop is that the Endian Firewall is not merely a pure router-firewall combination, but a comprehensive gateway security solution (Unified Threat Management). For this, a virus scanner and a spam blocker have been firmly integrated into the distribution. This allows the transport of HTTP, FTP, POP3 and SMTP scanned in real-time and optionally filtered.

Also, the menus were refined from the IPCop approach, reducing complexity, but also reducing reconfigurability of the individual services.

Concerning the business model, Endian is different to its origins in SmoothWall and IPCop as follows:

- SmoothWall: a commercial version is developed by SmoothWall Ltd and a free version by a community of volunteers. Innovations in the commercial version are only partially transferred, and security updates are sometimes deliberately delayed in the free version. This policy was the reason for the forking of Smoothwall and community development of IPCop.
- IPCop: development exclusively by a community of volunteers with only a free version.
- Endian Firewall: Friendly refinement of IPCop with the aim to expand the software functions to create a comprehensive security gateway software. As with SmoothWall, Endian Firewall also includes features in the commercial version functions that are missing from the free community version.

== Resonance ==
- The Endian Firewall is part of c't-Debian-Server Version 4 (published by August 2009) and this was already 2007.
- In July 2005, the Endian firewall was OSDir elected Project of the Week.
- The Linux Magazine 09/2008 has Endian Firewall UTM Appliances 2.2 and tested the system to certify a test result in the upper middle of comparable products.
