= Run-Time Abstraction Services =

Run-Time Abstraction Services (RTAS) is run-time firmware that provides abstraction to some operating systems. These include those running on IBM System i and IBM System p computers.

It contrasts with Open Firmware, in that the latter is usually used only during boot, while RTAS is used during run-time.

Later it was renamed to Open Power Abstraction Layer (OPAL), and it's stored in a PNOR (platform NOR) flash memory.

Ppc64-diag, libservicelog, servicelog, and powerpc-utils packages can be used to diagnose RTAS events.
