= Open Firmware =

Standard for computer bootstrap code

- Status: Withdrawn
- First published: 28 October 1994
- Domain: Boot firmware
- Website: playground.sun.com at the Wayback Machine (archived 2007-06-30)

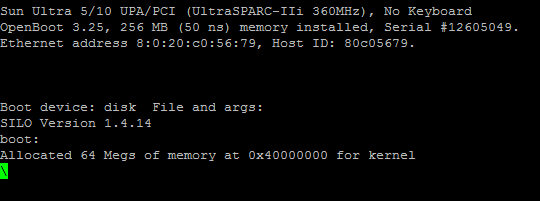
OpenBoot screenshot

Open Firmware is a standard defining the interfaces of a computer firmware system, formerly endorsed by the Institute of Electrical and Electronics Engineers (IEEE). It originated at Sun Microsystems where it was known as OpenBoot, and has been used by multiple vendors including Sun, Apple, IBM and ARM.

Open Firmware allows a system to load platform-independent drivers directly from a PCI device, improving compatibility.

Open Firmware may be accessed through its command line interface, which uses the Forth programming language.

== History ==
Open Firmware was described by IEEE standard as IEEE 1275-1994. This standard was not reaffirmed by the Open Firmware Working Group (OFWG) since 1998, and was therefore officially withdrawn by IEEE in May 2005.

== Features ==
Open Firmware defines a standard way to describe the hardware configuration of a system, called the device tree. This helps the operating system to better understand the configuration of the host computer, relying less on user configuration and hardware polling. For example, Open Firmware is essential for reliably identifying slave I^{2}C devices like temperature sensors for hardware monitoring, whereas the alternative solution of performing a blind probe of the I^{2}C bus, as has to be done by software like lm_sensors on generic hardware, is known to result in serious hardware issues under certain circumstances.

Open Firmware Forth Code may be compiled into FCode, a bytecode which is independent of instruction set architecture. A PCI card may include a program, compiled to FCode, which runs on any Open Firmware system. In this way, it can provide boot-time diagnostics, configuration code, and device drivers. FCode is also very compact, so that a disk driver may require only one or two kilobytes. Therefore, many of the same I/O cards can be used on Sun systems and Macintoshes that used Open Firmware. FCode implements ANS Forth and a subset of the Open Firmware library.

Being based upon an interactive programming language, Open Firmware can be used to efficiently test and bring up new hardware. It allows drivers to be written and tested interactively. Operational video and mouse drivers are the only prerequisite for a graphical interface suitable for end-user diagnostics. Apple shipped such a diagnostic "operating system" in many Power Macintoshes. Sun also shipped an FCode-based diagnostic tool suite called OpenBoot Diagnostics (OBDiag) used by customer service support and hardware manufacturing teams.

== Implementations and licensing ==
Several commercial implementations of Open Firmware have been released to the Open Source community since 2006, including Sun OpenBoot, Firmworks OpenFirmware and Codegen SmartFirmware. The source code is available from the OpenBIOS project. Sun's implementation is available under a BSD license.

== See also ==
- Coreboot – Open-source computer firmware
- Power-on self-test – Process performed by firmware or software routines
- PowerPC Reference Platform – Computer system architecture
- UEFI – Technical specification for firmware architecture
