= Philips 68070 =

16/32-bit processor

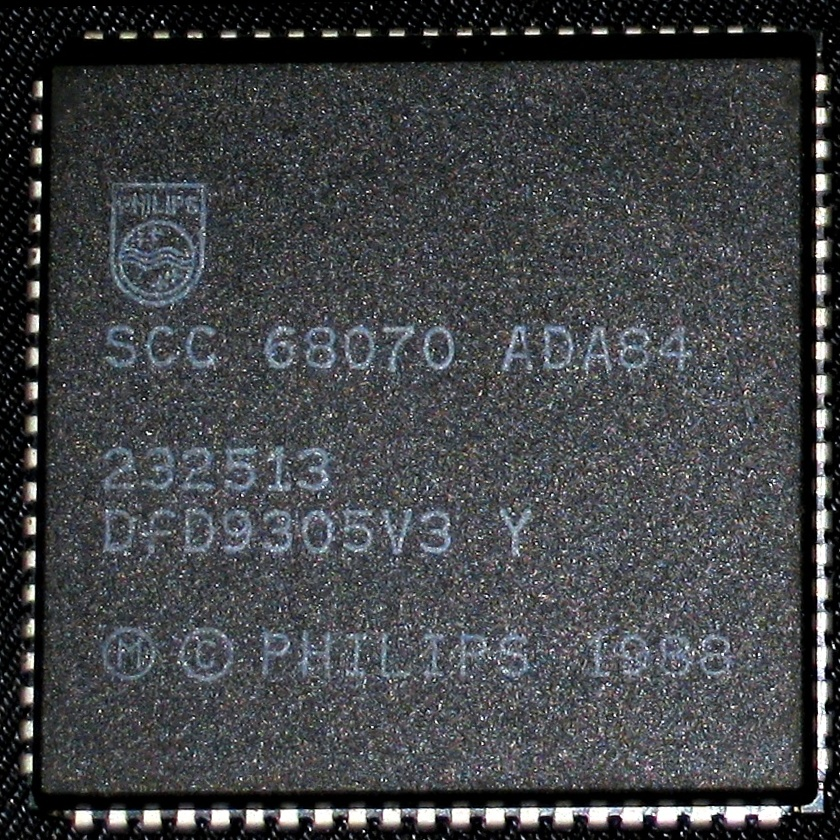
SCC68070

The SCC68070 is a discontinued Motorola 68000–based 16/32-bit processor produced under license by Philips Semiconductors. The processor was co-developed by Philips Semiconductors and Signetics and introduced in October 1985. Philips had been a second source of the Motorola 68000 before introducing the 68070. It was marketed by Philips as a high-performance microcontroller to compete with the Intel 80186. It suffered from poor adoption rates on account of its high cost due to the large size of its die. In 1990, Philips released the companion SCC66470 VSC (Video and Systems Controller) for the 68070. Both were adopted for Philips's ill-fated CD-i line of interactive entertainment systems. The CD-i soon became the 68070's overwhelming usage.

Despite its numbering, the 68070 predates the Motorola 68030 and later models- it does not follow Motorola's own chronological numbering scheme and is not (as might otherwise be implied) the successor to the 68060 which was released approaching a decade after the 68070.

== Specifications ==
The Philips 68070 was initially fabricated with a 2-μm CMOS process and was packaged in an 84-pin plastic leaded chip carrier. Additions to the Motorola 68000 core include:

- Operation from 4 to 17.5 MHz
- Inclusion of a minimal, segmented MMU supporting up to 16 MB of memory
- Built-in DMA controller
- I^{2}C bus controller
- UART
- 16-bit counter/timer unit
- 2 match/count/capture registers allowing the implementation of a pulse generator, event counter or reference timer
- Clock generator

Differences from the Motorola 68000 core include the following:

- Instruction execution timing is completely different.
- Interrupt handling has been simplified.
- The SCC68070 has MC68010 style bus-error recovery. They are not compatible, so exception error processing is different.
- The SCC68070 lacks a dedicated address generation unit (AGU), so operations requiring address calculation run slower due to contention with the shared ALU. This means that most instructions take more cycles to execute, for some instructions significantly more, than a 68000.
- The MMU is not compatible with the Motorola 68451 or any other "standard" Motorola MMU, so operating system code dealing with memory protection and address translation is not generally portable. Enabling the MMU also costs a wait state on each memory access.

While the SCC68070 is mostly binary compatible with the Motorola 68000, there is no equivalent chip in the Motorola 680x0 series. In particular, the SCC68070 is not a follow-up to the Motorola 68060, which came out in 1994 (postdating the 68070 by nearly a decade).
