= 060 =

060 may refer to:

- Motorola 68060 microprocessor
- 0-6-0, wheel arrangement for railway locomotives
- Emergency telephone number in Mexico, "060"
- Bermuda, country code "060" (ISO 3166-1 numeric)
- Chimay in the Belgian telephone numbering plan (area code "060")
