= DraCo =

Video editing workstation

- Developer: MacroSystem, Commodore
- Manufacturer: MS MacroSystem Computer GmbH
- Product family: Amiga
- Type: Workstation
- Released: 1994; 32 years ago
- Introductory price: US$14,990 (equivalent to $31,801 in 2024)
- Discontinued: 2000
- Operating system: AmigaOS (v3.1), NetBSD
- CPU: Eltanin
- Memory: 4–128 MB
- Storage: SCSI
- Graphics: Altais
- Backward compatibility: AmigaOS
- Predecessor: Amiga
- Successor: Casablanca Classic
- Website: http://www.macrosystem.de

The DraCo, also known as DraCo Vision in one of its later models, was a non-linear video editing workstation created by German MS MacroSystem Computer GmbH in 1994, based on the Amiga platform.

== History ==
In Germany, a group of Amiga hardware developers, working for what was called at that time MS MacroSystem Computer GmbH, started to deal with the fact that Commodore was going bankrupt and the supply of Amigas would eventually dry up, finishing their commercial venture. In 1994 MacroSystem took the decision of building an Amiga clone geared towards affordable digital video. The task was accomplished in a period of nine months by a group of sixteen people. After four months they had a booting prototype. In their design, they integrated, and then, slightly modified most of the hardware devices they already sold in the past, in this new NLE computer.

== Hardware ==
The DraCo tower

=== Central processing unit ===
The CPU card, called Eltanin, was based on the Warp Engine Amiga accelerator board. It featured a 68060 processor with FPU and MMU at 50 MHz and on some special models it used a 68040.

=== Memory ===
DraCos had a unified memory architecture. If DraCos are queried on the chipmem they have, they display the video card's framebuffer size (usually 4 MB). The Eltanin card contains four 72 pin SIMM sockets to hold up to 128 MB of RAM.

=== Custom chipset ===
Unlike traditional Amigas, DraCos lack the Amiga custom chipset, and so they rely on software APIs that retarget many hardware functions.

=== Busboard ===
The computer bus had some peculiarities. The Rastaban was a passive busboard full of expansion slots (much like S-100 busboards). It had five Zorro II Amiga compatible slots, and three DracoDirect slots. There was also a special CPU slot for an Alpha processor, that was never released. Zorro II slots offered a fair degree of Amiga compatible hardware options. On the other side, the DracoDirect slots provided faster speeds and 32-bit transfers, as they were merely created by exposing the majority of the microprocessor signals in those slots.

=== Graphics ===
The graphics card, was a slightly modified Retina Z3 now called Altais, that used the DracoDirect slot instead of the Zorro III slot, as it provided faster transfer rates. It was supported by the operating system by the then new CyberGraphX retargetable graphics subsystem.

=== Sound and video capture ===
The sound card and frame grabber (Toccata and Vlab Motion cards) were optionals, and were eventually built together in a standalone DracoDirect card called Dracomotion.

=== Storage ===
DraCos featured a Fast SCSI II interface to provide fast disk access with minimum CPU usage (transfer speeds were approximately 9 MB per second). An internal 50 pin and an external sub D 25 pin connectors were both present. The SCSI interface and its custom logic were built into the Eltanin board.

=== Casing ===
The case was a standard PC AT one, later replaced by a "cube" shaped one, which provided more space, better shielding and improved PSU. The marketing goal behind this case change, was to give potential customers the perception, by its different shape, that the machine was not an ordinary PC.

== Software ==
System ran AmigaOS 3.1 and included bundles applications and utilities. System used original Amiga 3000 Kickstart ROM, along with a different Setpatch command which did patching of the ROM when booting. It used a custom software called MovieShop to manage digital video editing.

== The end of the DraCo ==
MacroSystem sold and supported DraCos up to the year 2000. With the high price the system was not meant for consumers. The DraCo was redesigned to produce a more affordable system which was named Casablanca, now called Casablanca Classic.
