= Motorola 68851 =

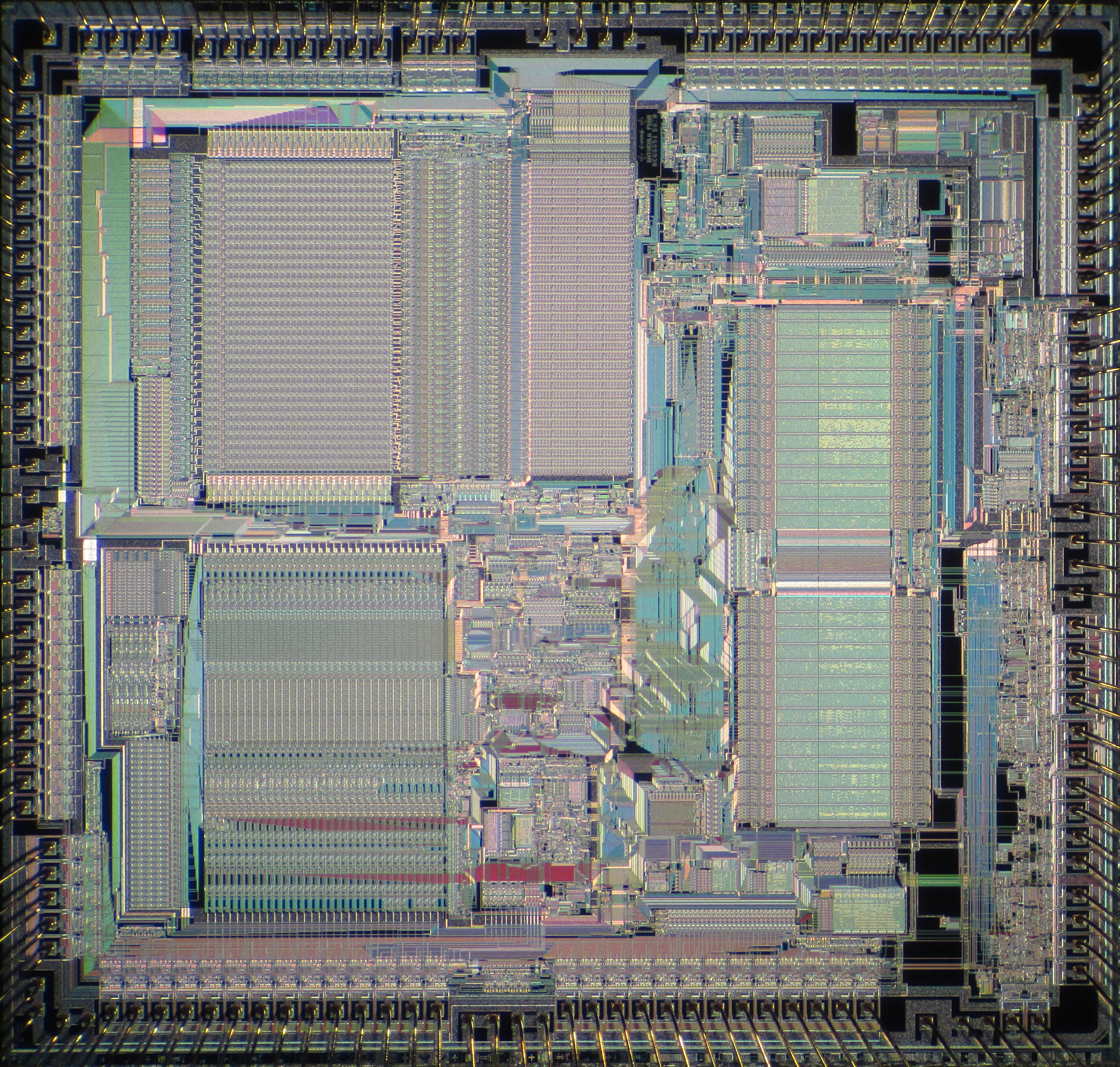
Motorola 68851 die

The Motorola 68851 is an external Memory Management Unit (MMU) which is designed to provide paged memory support for the 68020 using that processor's coprocessor interface. In theory it can be used with other processors such as the 68010 by simulating the coprocessor interface in software.

Later 68K family processors such as the 68030, 68040, and 68060 have an internal MMU, and will not operate with the 68851, except possibly by simulation of the coprocessor interface.

The 68851 was available as an option for the Apple Macintosh II, and was necessary to run Apple's A/UX operating system. On the classic Mac OS, Connectix Virtual was released in early 1989 and used the 68851 to provide virtual memory, which was later integrated into System 7.

Very few cards for the Amiga make use of the 68851 primarily because it can only be used with a small range of processors and most Amigas and accelerator cards use a processor which either has its own MMU or cannot support an MMU. One of the few cards which does use this is the Commodore A2620.

== See also ==
- Amiga 2500
- Motorola 68451
