= Atari FREDDIE =

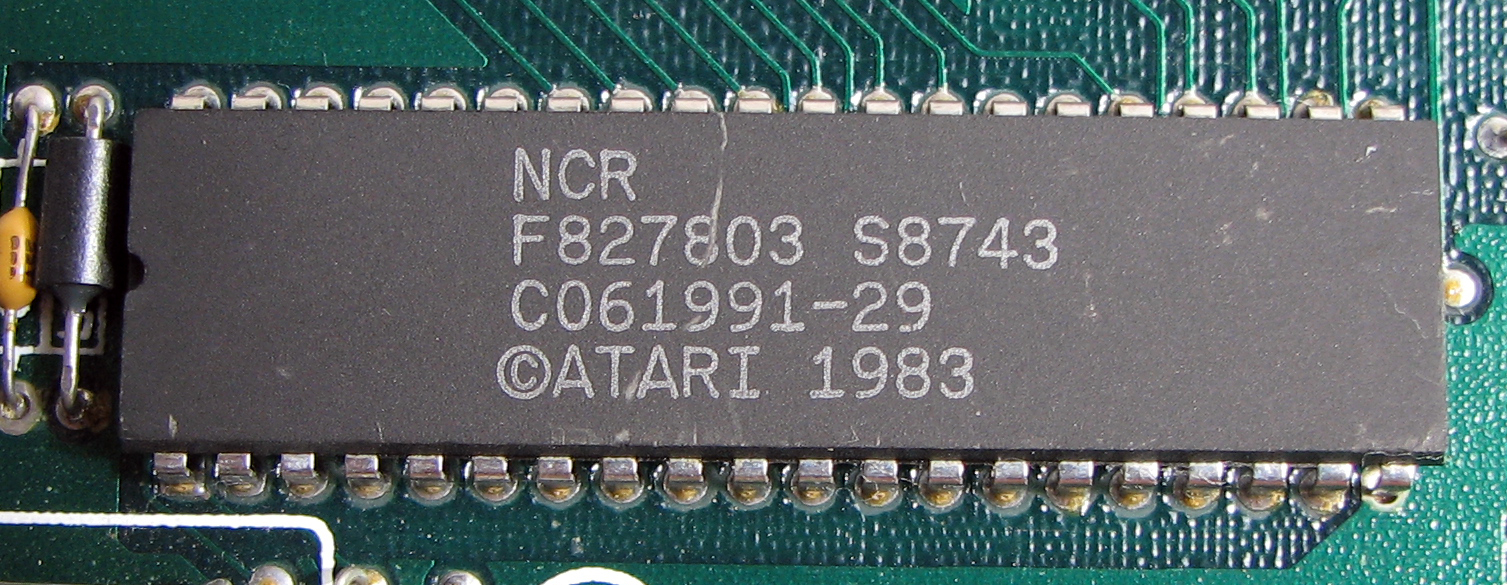
FREDDIE chip on an Atari 130XE circuit board

FREDDIE pin-out

FREDDIE is the name for a 40-pin large scale integrated circuit found in later model Atari 8-bit computers. It is a RAM address multiplexer, used for DRAM access. Atari created this chip to replace several other chips to cut costs and to enhance CPU and ANTIC memory access.

FREDDIE, combined with a C061618 MMU (XL/XE) and C025953 EMMU (130XE) allows the CPU and ANTIC to access memory independently of each other. Originally designed for the cancelled 1400XL and 1450XLD, it was eventually used in the 800XLF (labelled "800XL," refers to European version), 65XE, 130XE, and XEGS.
