= Robert P. Goldberg =

American computer scientist

- Born: December 4, 1944; Brooklyn, NY
- Died: February 25, 1994 (age 49); Boston, MA
- Education: MIT; Harvard University
- Known for: Popek and Goldberg virtualization requirements
- Scientific career
- Fields: Computer Scientist
- Workplaces: Harvard University; MIT; BGS Systems Inc.

Robert P. Goldberg (December 4, 1944 – February 25, 1994) was an American computer scientist, known for his research on operating systems and virtualization.

With Gerald J. Popek, he proposed the Popek and Goldberg virtualization requirements, a set of conditions necessary for a computer architecture to support system virtualization. In his Ph.D. thesis "Architectural Principles for Virtual Computer Systems", he also invented the classification for hypervisors which is now widely adopted in the area of virtual computer systems and computer science in general.

== Biography ==
Goldberg was born in Brooklyn, New York City, in 1944. He received the B.S. degree in mathematics from MIT in 1965 and the MA and Ph.D. degrees in Applied Mathematics from Harvard University, in 1969 and 1973, respectively.

In his Ph.D. thesis "Architectural Principles for Virtual Computer Systems", published 1974, he invented the classification for Hypervisors which is now widely adopted in the area of virtual computer systems and computer science in general. In 1974, with Gerald J. Popek, he proposed the Popek and Goldberg virtualization requirements, a set of conditions necessary for a computer architecture to support system virtualization.

From 1966 to 1972, he was a member of the research staff at MIT, first at Lincoln Laboratories and then at Project MAC. From 1971 to 1972, Goldberg served as a consultant to the director of engineering at Honeywell's Boston Computer Operations.

His teaching experience included lectureships at Brandeis University and Northeastern University. Goldberg was a member of ACM. He was the organizer of the Virtual Machine session at the 1973 National Computer Conference, was the program chairman and proceedings editor for the ACM SIGARCH-SIGOPS Workshop on Virtual Computer Systems, 1973 and has written and lectured extensively on many different aspects of virtual machine systems.

Goldberg was a member of the Honeywell Information Systems Technical Office in Waltham, MA and also a lecturer on Computer Science at Harvard University. His research interest included computer architectures, operating system design and evaluation, and data management systems at that time.

In 1978, Goldberg filed a patent under the name "Hardware virtualizer for supporting recursive virtual computer systems on a host computer system" (Patent Nr. 4253145), which was accepted in 1981 and is held by Honeywell Information Systems Inc.

In 1975, Goldberg, together with Jeffrey Buzen and Harold Schwenk (whose last names are represented in the initials of the company), founded a company called "BGS Systems, Inc." in the basement of Buzen's home in Lexington, MA. Over the next fifteen years, it moved five times, but always within Waltham, MA.

The company set out to develop products that provided centralized capacity management and planning capabilities for all major computing platforms. In addition, BGS created products that managed and evaluated computing systems such as UNIX, MVS, VM, OpenVMS, and the AS/400 as well as OS/2 and Windows NT. By the early 1980s, the company would claim over 30,000 installations worldwide with its BEST/1 product. This software, which was based on queuing theory, was devised by the three founders and promoted by the company as being the de facto standard for capacity management and planning in heterogeneous distributed environments. (1998 BGS Systems was acquired by BMC Software, Inc. The transaction was valued at approximately $285 million.)

=== Death and afterward ===
Goldberg died on 25 February 1994 in Boston, at the age of 49, after suffering from cancer.

== Published works ==
- Goldberg, Robert P., Architectural Principles for Virtual Computer Systems. Ph.D. thesis, Harvard University, Cambridge, MA, 1972. PDF available.
- Goldberg, Robert P., Survey of Virtual Machine Research, Honeywell Information Systems and Harvard University, 1974.
