= Motorola 68000 Educational Computer Board =

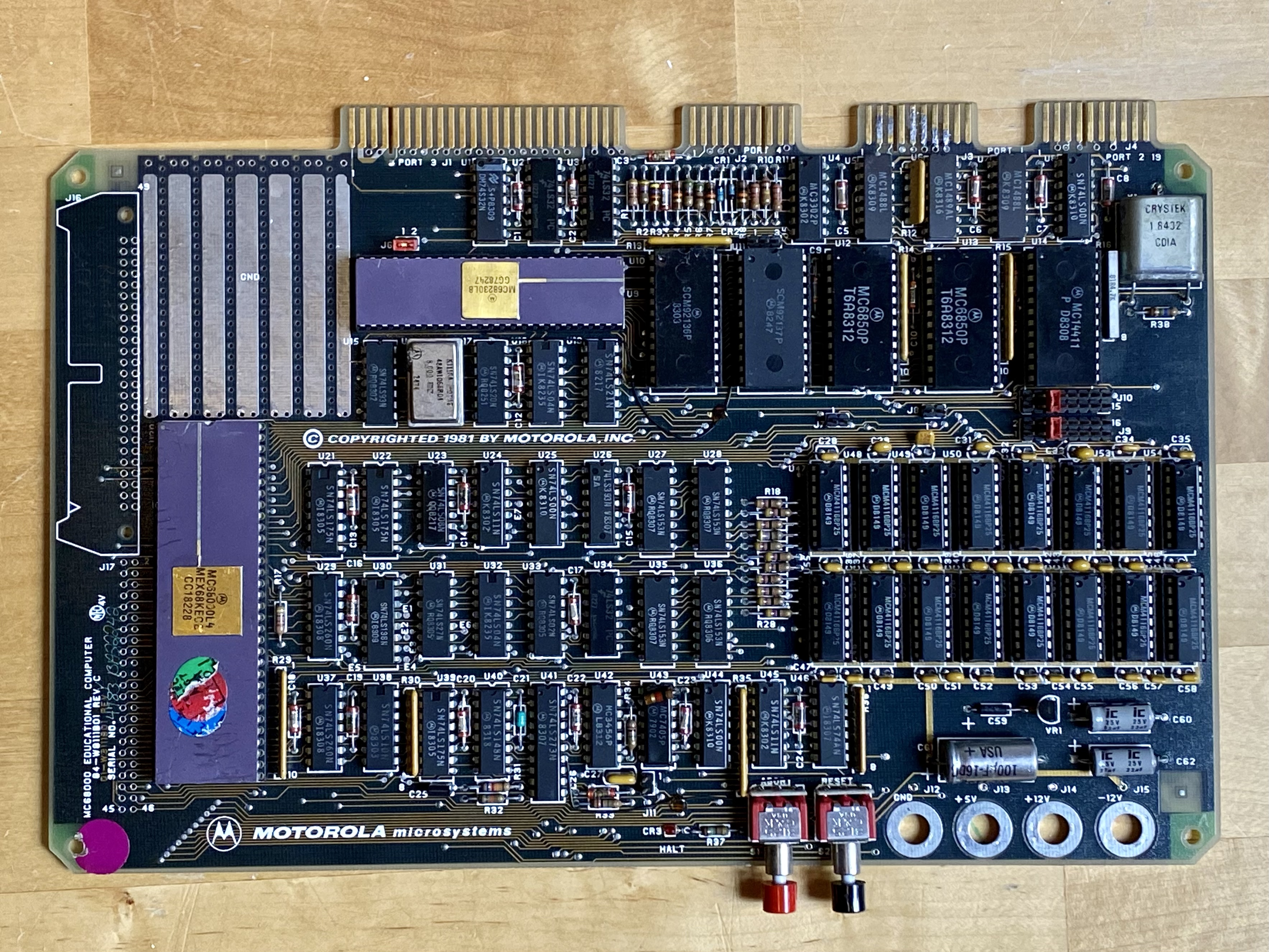
A Motorola MEX68KECB Microcomputer, circa 1981. This microcomputer is based on a Motorola 68000 16/32-bit microprocessor.

The Motorola 68000 Educational Computer Board (MEX68KECB) was a development board for the Motorola 68000 microprocessor, introduced by Motorola in 1981. It featured the 68K CPU, memory, I/O devices and built-in educational and training software.

== Hardware ==
- CPU: 4-MHz Motorola 68000
- RAM: 32KB
- ROM: 16KB
- 9600 baud serial port for dumb terminal connection
- 9600 baud serial port for host computer connection
- Parallel port for communication and printer connection
- Audio output for tape storage
- 24-bit programmable interval timer
- Wire-wrap area for custom circuitry
- Required power voltages: -12V, +5V and +12V

== Software ==
The board has built-in 16K ROM memory containing assembly/disassembly/stepping/monitoring software called TUTOR. The software was operated using command-line interface over a serial link, and provided many commands useful in machine code debugging. Memory contents (including programs) could be dumped via a serial link to a file on the host computer. The file was transferred in Motorola's S-Record format. Similarly, files from host could be uploaded to the board's arbitrary user memory area.

== Price ==
The price of the Motorola ECB at launch was US$495 (equivalent to $1,750 in 2025) which was relatively inexpensive for a computer with an advanced for that time 16/32-bit CPU.

== Use ==
According to the manual, for basic use only a dumb terminal and power source are required. However, it seems that in colleges the board was predominantly used in connection with a time-sharing host computer to teach assembly language programming and other computer science subjects.
