= Killer NIC =

Network interface card manufactured by Bigfoot Networks

The Killer NIC (Network Interface Card), from Bigfoot Networks (now a subsidiary of Intel Corporation), is designed to circumvent the Microsoft Windows TCP/IP stack, and handle processing on the card via a dedicated network processor. Most standard network cards are host based, and make use of the primary CPU. The manufacturer claims that the Killer NIC is capable of reducing network latency and lag. The card was first introduced in 2006.

== Hardware and Models ==
The Killer NIC comes in 2 models; the K1 and the M1. Both models contain a Freescale PowerQUICC processor, 64 MB RAM, a single Gigabit Ethernet port, as well as a single USB 2.0 port, intended for use with specialized programs running on the card's embedded Linux operating system.

The primary difference between the models is that the M1 has a stylized metallic heat sink, and a processor running at 400 MHz, while the K1 lacks a heat sink, and runs at only 333 MHz. Currently performance differences between the cards are limited, although it was believed that future programs designed for the cards will be capable of utilizing the increased processing power of the M1.

Killer NIC is offered as a stand-alone product or is bundled with computers from OEMs like the Dell XPS 630.

Some desktop motherboards ship with Killer networking interfaces built-in, such as gaming motherboards from Gigabyte, MSI, and ASRock.

== Flexible Network Architecture / Game Networking DNA ==
The Flexible Network Architecture is a framework used to create and run Flexible Network Applications. These applications run on the embedded Linux operating system, and are accessed through a driver interface within the host computer's operating system. Aside from that, they use very little of the computers resources, instead handling processing on the card's processing unit. Bigfoot Networks has released a software development kit (SDK) that allows third-party developers to create their own applications. Bigfoot also publishes some of their own applications; these include a firewall, BitTorrent client, FTP application, and Telnet service that allows access to the Killer NIC's OS. This was considered a breakthrough at the time as independent reviews verified that gaming and downloading would proceed without interfering with each other.

Programs that download files often use the USB port to transfer data to external storage, making the Killer NIC useful as a NAS albeit at the generally higher power draw of a desktop PC, compared to a device like a NSLU2.

More typically applications that benefit from low latency, such as Skype or SIP or older VoIP using USB devices (NetTalk, MagicJack) may benefit. As these increasingly use Ethernet directly to routers, however, which would generally be a much lower latency than using a PC and USB connection.

However, FNA is not widely supported as of 2012 and interfaces with more typical router operating systems like DD-WRT, OpenWRT, NetBSD, FreeBSD, OpenBSD, or with proprietary router OS, have not generally been updated.

The successor technology, Game Networking DNA, now supported by Qualcomm Atheros, remains a Microsoft Windows-only solution.

== Reception ==
Early reactions to the Killer NIC centered on price, with its initial MSRP of $280. This led to widespread skepticism and speculation that the product was merely attempting a money grab, hoping to cash in on the "bling" aspect of enthusiast computing. However, using a F.E.A.R. benchmark IGN found that the Killer NIC increased framerate from 15.41 to 23.5 frame/s. While recognizing the potential for real performance gains, they also noted that the test systems were already struggling with the game, and that having a higher-end machine in the first place could offset the gains made by the Killer NIC. This supposition was supported by Anandtech's findings, which showed some real, but much less dramatic gains. IGN declined to rate the card with a score, saying that more testing with other games would be needed. They remarked that the potential performance gain with the Killer NIC was probably higher than upgrading a $300 video card from one generation to the next. Anandtech noted that the people who would stand to gain the most benefit from the Killer NIC, the low-end users, would also be the ones least likely to pay $280 for a network card.
