= NXP ColdFire =

Microprocessor

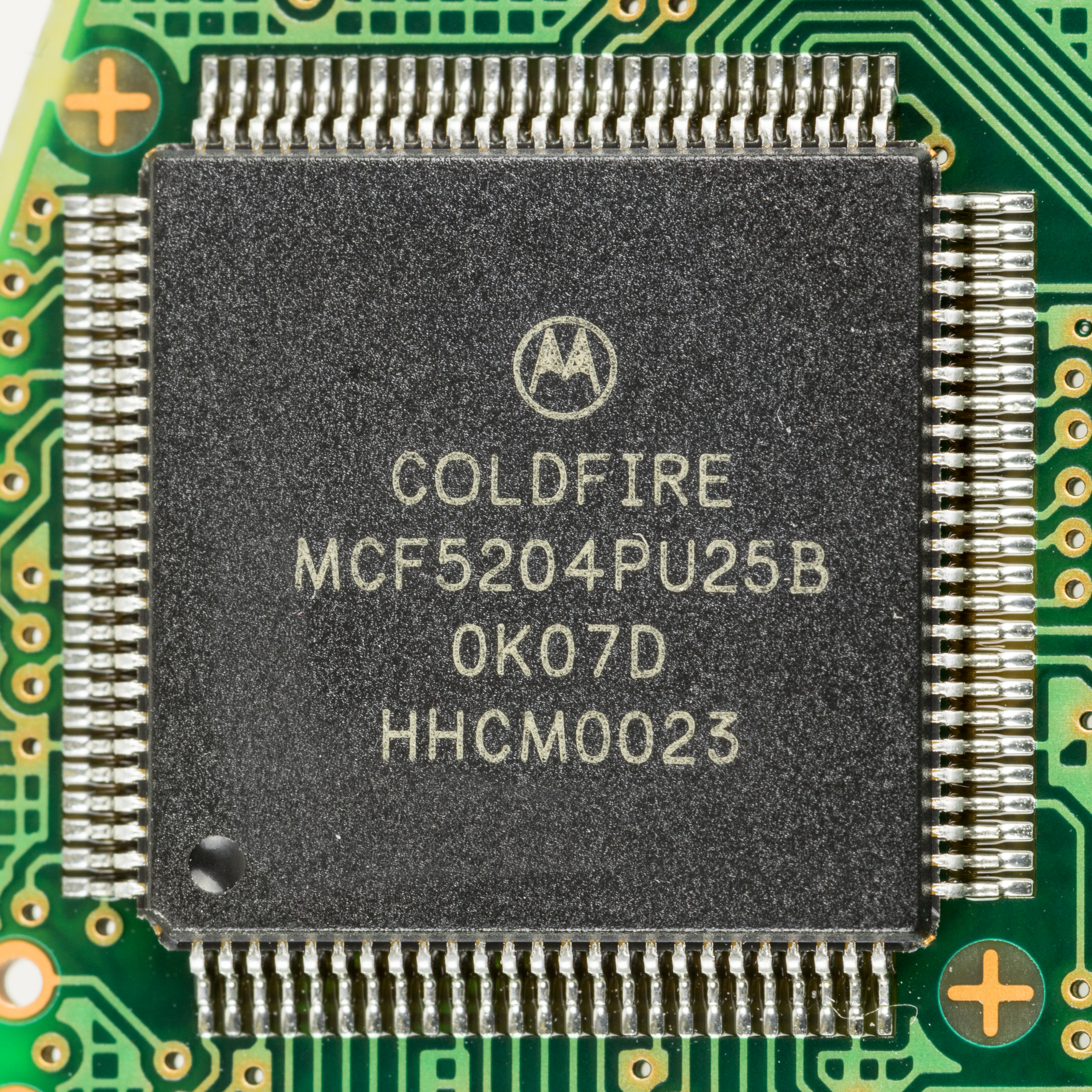

General information
- Common manufacturer: NXP Semiconductors
- Max. CPU clock rate: to 300 MHz

Physical specifications
- Cores: 1

Architecture and classification
- Application: Embedded systems
- Instruction set: Modified Motorola 68000 family

History
- Predecessor: Motorola 68060

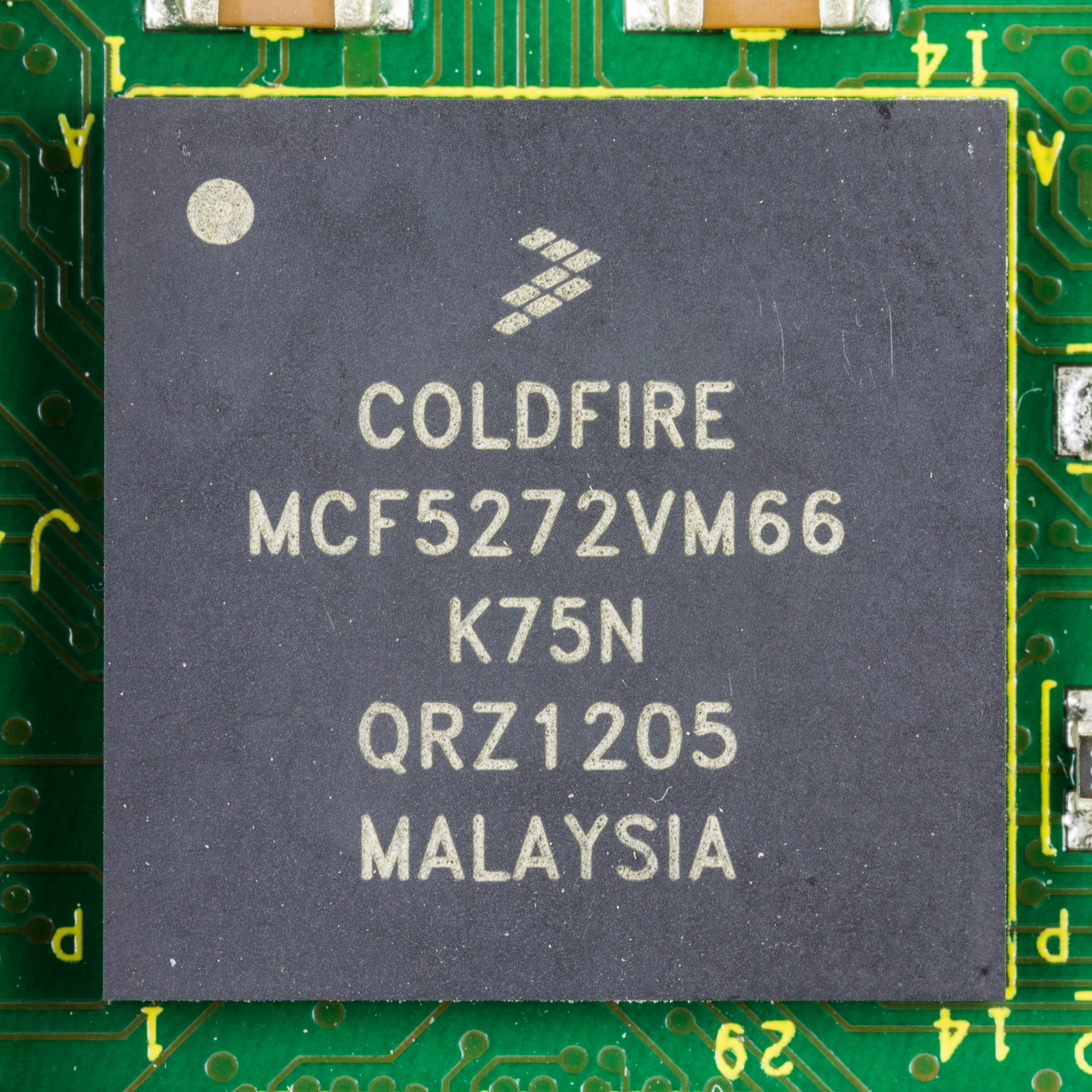
Freescale Coldfire MCF5272VM66

The NXP ColdFire is a microprocessor that derives from the Motorola 68000 family architecture, manufactured for embedded systems development by NXP Semiconductors. It was formerly manufactured by Freescale Semiconductor (formerly the semiconductor division of Motorola) which merged with NXP in 2015.

== Instruction set ==
The ColdFire instruction set is "assembly source" compatible (by means of translation software available from the vendor) and not entirely object code compatible with the 68000. When compared to classic 68k hardware, the instruction set differs mainly in that it no longer has support for the binary-coded decimal (BCD) packed data format; it removes a number of other, less used instructions; and most instructions that are kept support fewer addressing modes. Also, floating point intermediates are 64 bits and not 80 bits as in the 68881 and 68882 coprocessors. The instructions are only 16, 32, or 48 bits long, a simplification compared to the 68000 series.

== Models ==
There are five generations or versions of the ColdFire available from Freescale:

- v1: Intended to support migration from 8-bit microcontrollers, it is a cut-down version of the v2 processor-wise. It was launched in 2006, 12 years after the original ColdFire. It is designed to easily replace the 8-bit Freescale 68HC08 microcontrollers and compete with low-end ARM chips.
- v2: The original ColdFire core launched in 1994. Single-issue pipeline, no MMU, no FPU. Versions are also available with MAC and enhanced MAC units.
- v3: Added an optional MAC unit.
- v4: Limited superscalar core.
- v4e (or eV4 in some documents): Enhanced version of the v4, launched in 2000. Adds optional MMU, FPU, and enhanced MAC unit to the architecture.
- v5: Fully superscalar core.

There is also the Fido 1100, a microcontroller launched in 2007 aimed at predictable embedded control systems such as Industrial Ethernet applications using the 68k/CPU32 instruction set. However, Fido has its own unique architecture and shares the instruction set with 68k only.

In November 2006, Freescale announced that ColdFire microprocessor cores were available for license as semiconductor Intellectual Property through their IP licensing and support partner IPextreme Inc. ColdFire v1 core is now available under Free license (and no per use royalty) for Altera Cyclone-III FPGA's.

In September 2007, Freescale launched the 32-bit Flexis microcontroller family with a ColdFire CPU core.

In June 2010, Freescale announced the ColdFire+ line, which is a ColdFire V1 core using a 90 nm TFS technology.

In 2010, Freescale also launched Kinetis, an ARM-based product line, leading some industry observers to speculate about the future of the ColdFire range, given that Freescale would have several competing CPU ranges.

== Linux support ==
In February 1999, the μClinux project's Linux kernel was ported to two ColdFire processors (MCF5206 and MCF5307). In 2006, the Debian project was looking into making its m68k port compatible with the ColdFires, as there are ColdFire models that can be clocked as high as 300 MHz. This is much faster than the 68060, which can officially reach 75 MHz and can be overclocked to 110 MHz.

== Applications ==
Stallion Technologies ePipe, Secure Computing SnapGear security appliances, and Arcturus Networks's System on Module products are based on ColdFire processors. There are ColdFire Linux-based single-board computers (SBC) with Ethernet and CompactFlash as small as 23×55 mm or 45×45 mm or based on CompactFlash (37×43 mm) itself. ColdFire based products have even been deployed to the International Space Station as an electronic nose project.

== See also ==
- FlexOS 68K for ColdFire MCF5251
- eCos and RTEMS open source real-time operating systems
