= QUICC =

The QUICC (Quad Integrated Communications Controller) was a Motorola 68k -based microcontroller made by Freescale Semiconductor, targeted at the telecommunications market. It lends its name to a family of successor chips called PowerQUICC.

== History ==
The original QUICC was the Motorola 68360 (MC68360), based on the MC68302. It was followed by the PowerPC-based PowerQUICC I, PowerQUICC II, PowerQUICC II+ and PowerQUICC III.

== Applications ==
QUICC chips form the core of many Motorola Cellular Base stations.

Many PowerQUICC II+ designs now have SATA controllers for SAN based applications.

PowerQUICC CPUs/boards come with a Linux environment. Freescale also offers MQX (a RTOS) for PPC.
