= Programmer and Operator Productivity Aid =

Programmer and Operator Productivity Aid (POP) is an application package written originally for the IBM System/34, which became much more popular and functional on the IBM System/36 and universal on the Advanced/36.

POP comprises four major tools:

- FILE, which provides easy access to disk files;
- LIBR, which provides easy access to libraries and library members;
- DISKETTE, which provides easy access to diskette files;
- FSEDIT, which is a full-screen text editor in the fashion of the System/38 and IBM i text editors.

POP does not have a function for folders. The Office/36 TEXTFLDR procedure is adequate for this function.

POP programs use a point-and-shoot interface. Many objects are displayed and to the left of each object is an input field. The operator interacts by moving the cursor to the desired object and marking it by typing a letter or number which represents a command or function.
