= IBM Advanced/36 =

Midrange computer

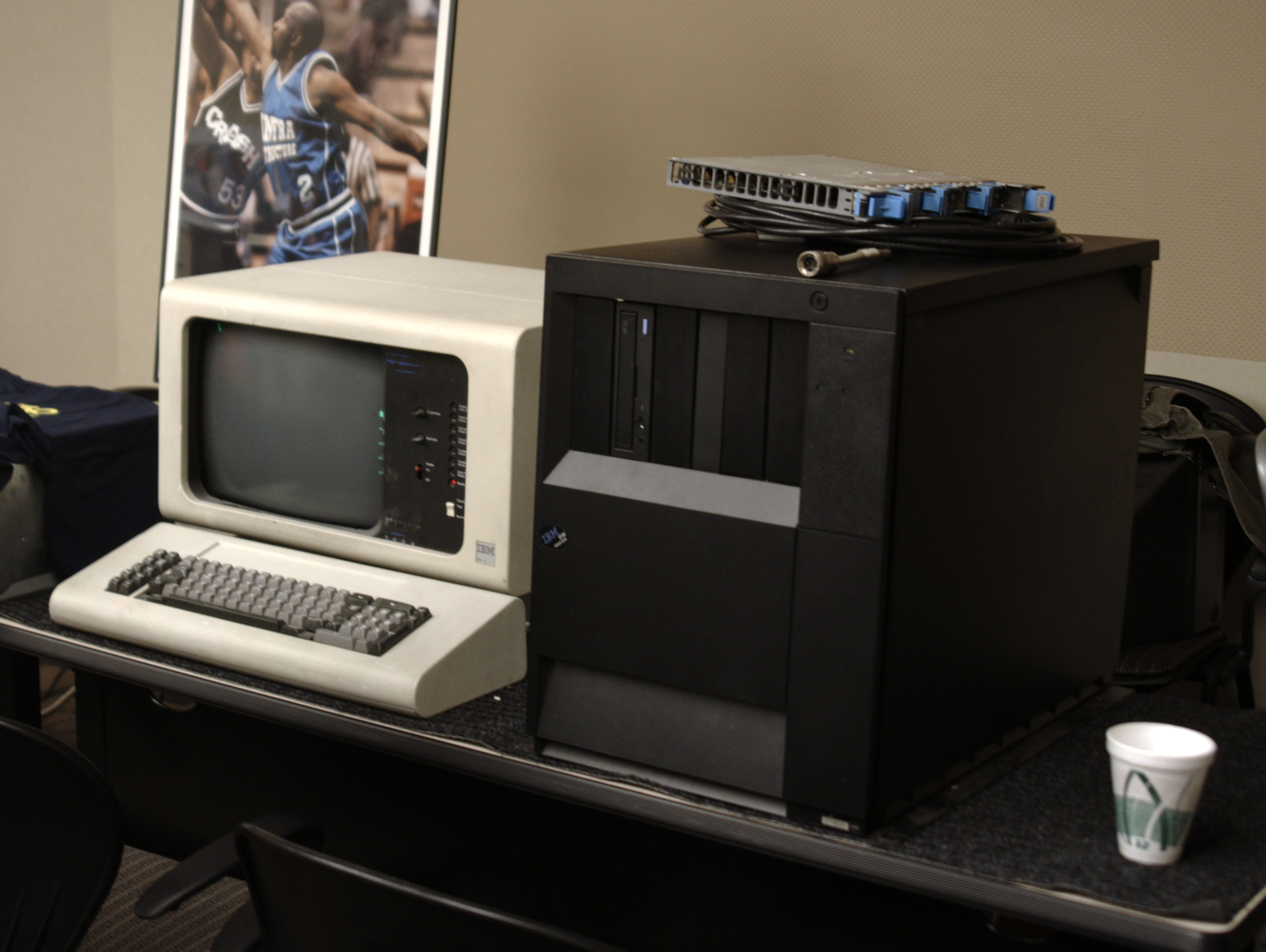
- AS/400 9402-400 model with expansion module and terminal; 9402-436 were based on a 9402-400.
- Manufacturer: IBM
- Introduced: October 4, 1994; 31 years ago
- Discontinued: 2000
- Cost: US$12,000 (Entry)
- Processor: 64-bit PowerPC AS
- Memory: 32 Mb (Entry); 64 Mb (Large)
- Language: RPG II; COBOL/400; FORTRAN; System/36 BASIC; Assembler; Query/36

The IBM Advanced/36 was an IBM midrange computer based on adapted IBM AS/400 computer hardware and System/36 IBM programmable software. It was marketed from October 1994 to January 1999/2000.

== Overview ==
The Advanced/36 is physically smaller than other S/36 offerings due to the use of more advanced hardware. It was cheaper, with prices beginning at US$12,000. The smallest 5362 sold for about US$20,000, and a maxed-out 5360 sold for upwards of US$200,000.

By 2000, the A/36 was no longer being marketed. The Advanced/36 Machine support in OS/400 was removed in V4R5.

== Configurations ==
The maximum configuration of an Advanced/36 is 4.19 GB of disk storage, 256 MB of memory, one tape drive, and one single 8" (or 5.25") diskette drive along with a communication adapter for modems (like BSCA/SLDC) and the twinax. brick(s) and a card for installing 9-track tape drive (9438-12).

The A/36 was marketed in three packages: the Small Package, the Growth Package, and the Large Package. A/36 Computers sold in 1994 contained a version of the System Support Program (SSP) operating system called "7.1". This was the 9402-236 model. In 1995, an upgraded A/36 was offered with a version of SSP called "7.5". These were the 9402-436 model. A 236 could be upgraded to a 436. The 436 model could also run OS/400.

There were three CPU options, differing by performance. The base was known as #2102, and the next level up was #2104, which was 1.3 times faster. The final option, #2106, was advertised as 2.4 times faster than the base model.

== Software ==
SSP for the A (Advanced)/36 supported the same programming languages as the standard S/36 systems, namely RPG II, COBOL, FORTRAN, System/36 BASIC, and Assembler. The Advanced/36 also included the Programmer and Operator Productivity Aid (POPA) utility as standard.

== Backup and storage ==
One difference between the A/36 and earlier S/36s is the 9402 Tape Drive. The 9402 uses Quarter-inch cartridges which can store up to 2.5 GB (Gigabytes) of data. The 9402 is able to read the 60MB tapes from the older S/36 6157 tape drive, but cannot write or do any SEND_DATA_BYTE operations with them, because they are newer than the older-style 1.0GB cartridges, which use the same pinout, and the same speed. Despite this, they cannot write the newer 2.5GB cartridges.

The A/36 CD-ROM drive is provided for PTF installation only. PTF CDs can only be applied if the operator follows a bypass procedure to switch device codes with the tape unit. The CD unit becomes TC. The CD unit was only on the A/436 model, not the A/236.

The A/36 8" floppy disk drive (FDD) is optional and was marketed for approximately US$1,000. A 5.25" floppy disk drive (FDD) option was also available. These were intended to allow migration of data from older S (System) /36 hardware.

IBM midrange computers
Preceded by IBM System/36	AS/400-based S/36; 1994 - 2000: Advanced/36 (236; 436) 1994 / Advanced/36 (170) 1996; AS/Entry / AS/Entry (150)	Succeeded by IBM System i
Preceded by IBM System/36	IBM AS/400	Succeeded by IBM System i
