= Workgroup =

Workgroup may refer to:

- Courtroom Workgroup, an informal arrangement between a criminal prosecutor, criminal defense attorney, and the judicial officer
- Workgroup (computer networking), a peer-to-peer computer network
- Working group, a group of people working together toward a common goal
- Work Group, American record label

== See also ==
- Working Group (disambiguation)
- Workgroup Server (disambiguation)
