= Point and shoot =

Point and shoot may refer to:

- Point-and-shoot camera
- Point-and-shoot interface
- "Point and Shoot", an episode of Better Call Saul

== Literature ==
Point and Shoot may refer to:

- Point and Shoot (film), a 2014 documentary film about Matthew VanDyke
- Point and Shoot, a book of street photography by Henry Bond
