= IBM Office/36 =

Office/36 was a suite of applications marketed by IBM from 1983 to 2000 for the IBM System/36 family of midrange computers. IBM announced its System/36 Office Automation (OA) strategy in 1985.

Office/36 could be purchased in its entirety, or piecemeal. Components of Office/36 include:

- IDDU/36, the Interactive Data Definition Utility.
- Query/36, the Query utility.
- DisplayWrite/36, a word processing program.
- Personal Services/36, a calendaring system and an office messaging utility.

Query/36 was not quite the same as SQL, but it had some similarities, especially the ability to very rapidly create a displayed recordset from a disk file. Note that SQL, also an IBM development, had not been standardized prior to 1986.

DisplayWrite/36, in the same category as Microsoft Word, had online dictionaries and definition capabilities, and spell-check, and unlike the standard S/36 products, it would straighten spillover text and scroll in real time.

Considerable changes were required to S/36 design to support Office/36 functionality, not the least of which was the capability to manage new container objects called "folders" and produce multiple extents to them on demand. Q/36 and DW/36 typically exceeded the 64K program limit of the S/36, both in editing and printing, so using Office products could heavily impact other applications. DW/36 allowed use of bold, underline, and other display formatting characteristics in real time.
