= Operational Control Language =

Operational Control Language (OCL) is the control language of the IBM System/3, System/32, System/34 and System/36 minicomputer family. It is supported on IBM i's System/36 Environment for backwards compatibility purposes. It is similar to the older control languages JCL (System/370), and unrelated to the later Control Language (System/38 and IBM AS/400), and REXX (AS/400).

== Overview ==
OCL statements are used to directly load user or system programs into memory, assign system resources to them, and transfer system control to them in a process called execution. The fact that a program is stored on a computer's disk drive does not in itself cause the computer to process or execute the program.

OCL statements can be entered manually from the keyboard, but are generally stored as a procedure member. A procedure member is a freely editable member within a library, it is a source file. On the S/32, S/34, and S/36, procedures are not compiled, they are interpreted.

== Example ==
OCL statements usually begin with two slashes and at least one space character. Here's an example of a procedure stored on a System/36 as member PROC1:

** Procedure PROC1                  Optional documentation
** 
** Written by Joe User 2006-05-29
**
** 
// * 'PROC1 procedure is running'
// * ' '
// IFF ACTIVE-'PROC2,PROC3' GOTO OKAY
**                                  IFF means 'if false'
**                                  ACTIVE-'name1,name2' means true
**                                  if at least one of the listed programs is currently running
**                                  GOTO xxx means skip to the statement
**                                  that has a TAG xxx and resume processing
// PAUSE 'Cannot continue because other Payroll is running'
**                                  Halts execution with a message
// CANCEL                           Stops execution of this procedure
// TAG OKAY
// IFF DATAF1-PFILE1 IFF DATAF1-PFILE2 GOTO NODELT
// * 'Caution, Pay Data Exists'     Displays information on terminal
// * ' '
// * 'Press 1 to continue and DELETE existing files'
// IFF '1'=?1R? CANCEL              A parameter is indicated by question marks surrounding a number
**                                  Using 1R between question marks indicates
**                                  that the parameter is required
**                                  and processing waits for user input.  
**                                  CANCEL means immediately go to end of job.
// LOAD $DELET                      $DELET is used to delete files
// RUN
**                                  This program requires and processes, consumes,
**                                  succeeding statements as data up until an END statement 
// IF DATAF1-PFILE1 SCRATCH UNIT-F1,LABEL-PFILE1
**                                  Conditionally deletes an existing disk file
// IF DATAF1-PFILE2 SCRATCH UNIT-F1,LABEL-PFILE2
// END
**
// TAG NODELT
// LOAD PR101                       PR101 could be an RPG or COBOL program
// FILE NAME-PAYMAST,DISP-SHR       PAYMAST is the payroll master file
// FILE NAME-PFILE1,DISP-NEW,RECORDS-100,EXTEND-100
**                                  A new file PFILE1 is created and allocated
**                                  100 records are assigned to PFILE1
**                                  when all are used, the system tries to extend it by another 100
**                                  each time it fills.
// RUN
**                                  END statement is only necessary
**                                  for those programs enabled
**                                  to process any following statements as data
**                                  Such data does not need to be formatted like OCL
// SWITCH 1XX0XXXX                  Causes flags U1 through U8 to be SETON (1), OFF (0), or left as previously set (X)
**
// LOCAL OFFSET-1,DATA-'PROC1'      Places PROC1 in the Local Data Area (LDA)
// LOCAL OFFSET-101,DATA-'?USER?'   Substitutes the operator's User ID                        
**                                  LDA is accessed via a data structure, UDS within an RPG program
**                                  LDA and User switches (flags) remain available to succeeding programs
**                                  until set otherwise
**                                  Called sub-procedure members and loaded program's source code needs to be examined
**                                  as to whether or not the LDA and User switches are actually read or altered
// LOAD PR102
// FILE NAME-PAYMAST,DISP-SHR       DISP-SHR means the file is shared, versus exclusive access
**                                  Other programs can use PAYMAST at the same time
// FILE NAME-PFILE,LABEL-PFILE1     NAME/LABEL is used when the RPG file name reference
**                                  and the actual disk file label are different
// RUN
// RETURN                           Return to the calling procedure, otherwise end-of-job

This procedure member incorporates a variety of OCL statements, also procedure control expressions (PCE), resources, that is mostly files are allocated, and several job steps, that is programs are executed.

Comments are represented by an asterisk in column 1, and otherwise free-format. Or can be placed after the logical end of a statement, if there is no indicator for statement continuation onto the next line, like a trailing comma.
