= Working Group =

Working Group may refer to:

- Working group, a group of experts working together to achieve specified goals
- Working Group (dogs), a kennel club designation for certain purebred dog breeds
- Working Group (resistance organization), an underground group in the Slovak State which rescued Jews from the Holocaust

== See also ==
- Workgroup (disambiguation)
