= Data file =

Computer file

A data file is a computer file which stores data to be used by a computer application or system, including input and output data. A data file usually does not contain instructions or code to be executed (that is, a computer program).

Most of the computer programs work with data files.

== Types of data files ==
Data files can be stored in two ways:

- Text files;
- Binary files.

=== Text files ===
A text file (also called ASCII files) stores information in ASCII characters. A text file contains human-readable characters. A user can read the contents of a text file or edit it using a text editor. In text files, each line of text is terminated, (delimited) with a special character known as EOL (End of Line) character. In text files some internal translations take place when this EOL character is read or written.

Examples of text files

- A text document (often .txt)

=== Binary files ===
A binary file is a file that contains information in the same format in which the information is held in memory, i.e. in the binary form. In a binary file, there is no delimiter for a line. Also no translations occur in binary files. As a result, binary files are faster and easier for a program to read and write than the text files. As long as the file doesn't need to be read or ported to a different type of system, binary files are the best way to store program information.

Examples of binary files

- A JPEG image (.jpg or .jpeg)

== Data file categories ==
Closed data file formats, frequently referred to as proprietary format files, have their metadata data elements hidden, obscured or unavailable to users of the file. Application developers do this to discourage users from tampering with or corrupting the data files or importing the data into a competitor's application.

Open data format files have their internal structures available to users of the file through a process of metadata publishing. Metadata publishing implies that the structure and semantics of all the possible data elements within a file are available to users.

Examples of open data files include CSV, XLS and XML formats such as HTML for storing web pages or SVG for storing scalable graphics.

== See also ==
- Index file
- Indexed file
- Database
- Serialisation
