= Point-and-shoot interface =

Type of computer interface

A point-and-shoot interface is an efficient text-based interface, usually presented on a non-GUI platform such as mainframe computers.

In a point-and-shoot, many objects are displayed in a list, and to the left of each object is an input field. The operator interacts by moving the cursor to the desired object and marking it by typing a letter or number which represents a command or function.

== Example ==
An example of a point-and-shoot is presented here (the computer is an IBM System/36):

    ACT01  YOUR APPLICATION                               GoTo Cust#______________
           WORK WITH ACCOUNTS                             GoTo Name_______________
           SORT BY CUSTOMER NUMBER                        GoTo Addr_______________
 
     CUST#    NAME                  ADDRESS
   _ 29358235 SMITH, MARY           100 PARK PLAZA
   _ 30493404 JONES, JOHN           271 LINCOLN AVE
   _ 34034559 HOOTON, DENISE        56 BROADWAY         
   _ 36359523 HOWELL, BARBARA       POST OFFICE BOX 2358
   (More)
 
   COMMANDS: 2=Edit  4=Delete  5=Rename  H=History  P=Print  
   COMMAND KEYS: RollUp/Dn 5=Add 6=Sort 7=End 8=Change Application 9=Reports 24=Sign off

The top of the display is called the header. It contains the program name and description, and it allows the operator to immediately "go to" a certain partial or complete customer ID, name, or address. It identifies the columns of data presented.

The middle of the display is called the data area. It consists of one input-capable field and one output field per line.

The bottom of the display is called the footer or the legend. It describes the commands the operator can use on each object, and the command keys the operator can use to control the application.
