= Midrange computer =

Class of computer systems that fall in between mainframes and minicomputers

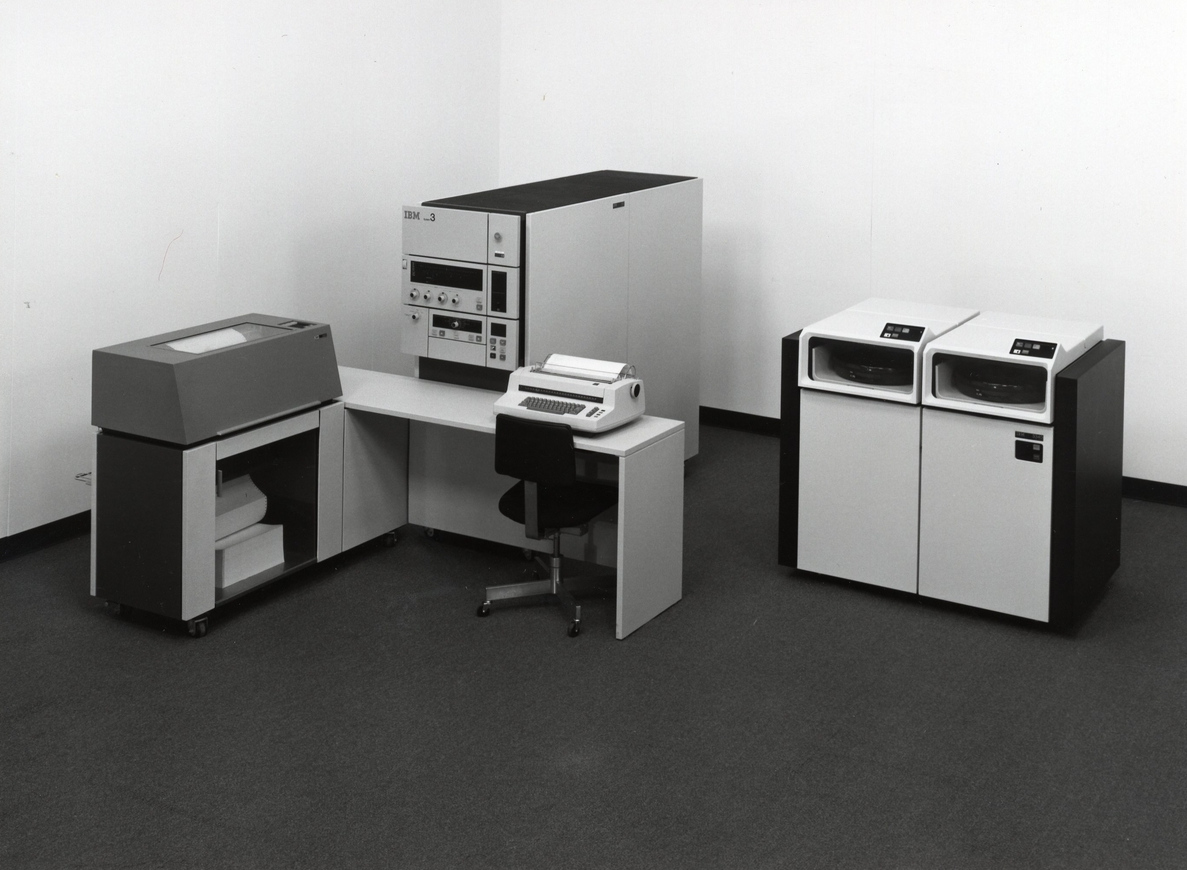
IBM System/3, a midrange computer introduced in 1969

Midrange computers, or midrange systems, were a class of computer systems that fell in between mainframe computers and microcomputers.

This class of machine emerged in the 1960s, with models from Digital Equipment Corporation (PDP lines), Data General (NOVA), and Hewlett-Packard (HP 2100 and HP 3000) widely used in science and research as well as for business - and referred to as minicomputers.

IBM favored the term "midrange computer" for their comparable, but more business-oriented systems.

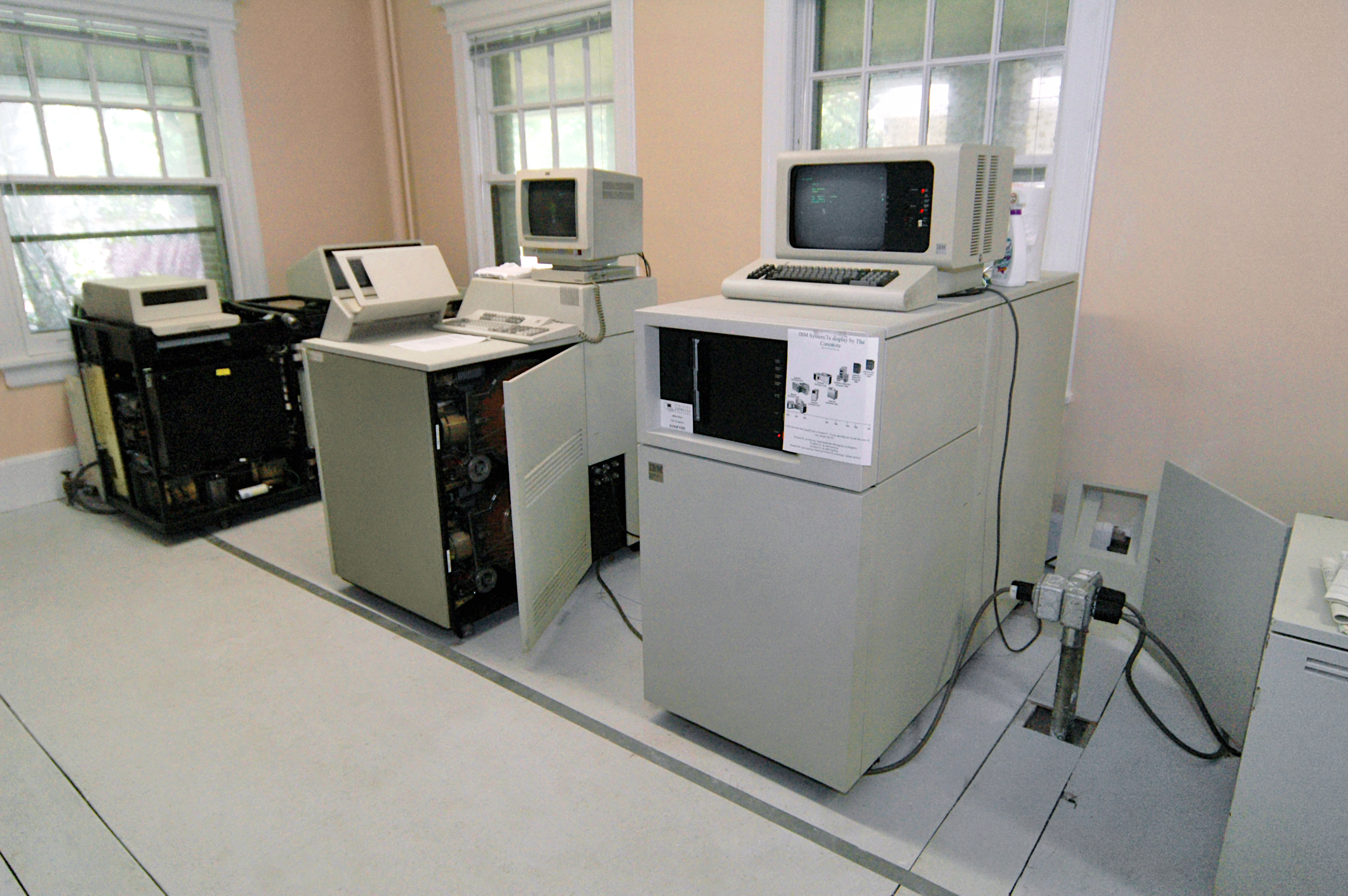
The S/38 (without case), the S/36, and the S/34 systems

== IBM midrange systems ==
- System/3 (1969) was the first IBM midrange system.
- System/32 (introduced in 1975) was a 16-bit single-user system also known as the IBM 5320.
- System/34 (1977) was intended to be a successor to both the 3 and the 32. It had two 16-bit processors and ran the SSP operating system.
- System/38 (1979) was the first midrange system to have an integrated relational database management system (DBMS). The S/38 had 48-bit addressing, and ran the CPF operating system.
- System/36 (1983) was a follow on to the System/34 with the same architecture and operating system.
- AS/400 was introduced under that name in 1988, renamed eServer iSeries in 2000, and subsequently became the IBM System i in 2006. It runs the OS/400 operating system.
- IBM Power Systems were introduced in April 2008, a convergence of IBM System i and IBM System p.

== Positioning ==
The main similarity of midrange computers and mainframes is that they are both oriented for decimal-precision computing and high volume input and output (I/O), but most midrange computers have a reduced and specially designed internal architecture, with limited compatibility with mainframes. A low-end mainframe can be more affordable and less powerful than a high-end midrange system, but a midrange system is still a "replacement solution" with another service process, different OS and internal architecture.

The difference between similar-size midrange computers and superminis/minicomputers is the purpose for which they are used - supers/minis are oriented towards floating-point scientific computing, and midrange computers are oriented towards decimal business-oriented computing - but without a clear distinction border between classes.

The earliest midrange computers were single-user business calculation machines. Virtualization, a typical feature of mainframes since 1972 (partially from 1965), was ported to midrange systems only in 1977; multi-user support was added to midrange systems in 1976 compared to 1972 for mainframes (but that's still significantly earlier than the limited release of x86 virtualization (1985/87) or multi-user support (1983)).

The latest midrange systems are primarily mid-class multi-user local network servers that can handle the large-scale processing of many business applications. Although not as powerful and reliable as full-size mainframe computers, they are less costly to buy, operate, and maintain than mainframe systems and thus meet the computing needs of many organizations. Midrange systems were relatively popular as powerful network servers to help manage large Internet Web sites, but more oriented for corporate intranets and extranets, and other networks. Today, midrange systems include servers used in industrial process-control and manufacturing plants and play major roles in computer-aided manufacturing (CAM). They can also take the form of powerful technical workstations for computer-aided design (CAD) and other computation and graphics-intensive applications. Midrange system are also used as front-end servers to assist mainframe computers in telecommunications processing and network management.

Since the end of 1980s, when the client–server model of computing became predominant, computers of the comparable class are instead usually known as workgroup servers and online transaction processing servers to recognize that they usually "serve" end users at their "client" computers. During the 1990s and 2000s, in some non-critical cases both lines were replaced by web servers, oriented for working with global networks, but with less security background, and mainly using General purpose architectures (currently x86 or ARM).

== See also ==
- IBM mainframe
- Superminicomputer
- Minicomputer
- Microcomputer
- List of IBM products
