= Workgroup Server =

Workgroup Server — is a class of servers, oriented for local workgroup, typically for operating with business applications.

This term also may refer to:

- Apple Workgroup Server — line of entry-level servers, produced between 1993 and 1999;
- IBM RS/6000 Type 7025 Workgroup servers — low-end/midrange servers, produced circa 1996-2001;
- IBM servers, oriented for working with IBM Db2 databases;
- Servers, oriented for working inside of Windows workgroup;
- Sun Enterprise and Sun SPARC low-end/midrange server lines.

== See also ==
- Windows for Workgroups
