= Indexed file =

Searchable computer file

An indexed file is a computer file with an index that allows random access to any record given its key, data which identifies a record within a file.

Many implementations of indexed files allow a file to have multiple indices. The first or only index, the primary index, contains the primary key. If other secondary indices are present, they contain alternate keys. The primary key must uniquely identify a record. If more than one index is present the other ones are called alternate indexes. The indexes are created with the file and maintained by the system.

IBM supports indexed files with the Indexed Sequential Access Method (ISAM) on OS/360 and successors. IBM virtual storage operating systems added VSAM, which supports indexed files as Key Sequenced Data Sets (KSDS), with more options. Support for indexed files is built into COBOL and PL/I. Other languages with more limited I/O facilities such as C support indexed files through add-on packages in a runtime library such as C-ISAM. Some of Digital's operating systems, such as OpenVMS, support indexed file I/O using the Record Management Services.

In recent systems, relational databases are often used in place of indexed files.

== Language support ==
The COBOL languages supports indexed files with the following command in the FILE CONTROL section

ORGANIZATION IS INDEXED

IBM PL/I uses the file attribute ENVIRONMENT(INDEXED) or ENVIRONMENT(VSAM) to declare an indexed file.

== See also ==
- B-trees
- Hash table
- Data set (IBM mainframe)
- Legacy system
- dbm also X/Open ndbm and GNU gdbm
- Berkeley DB
