= IBM System/23 Datamaster =

1981 IBM microcomputer

System/23 Datamaster
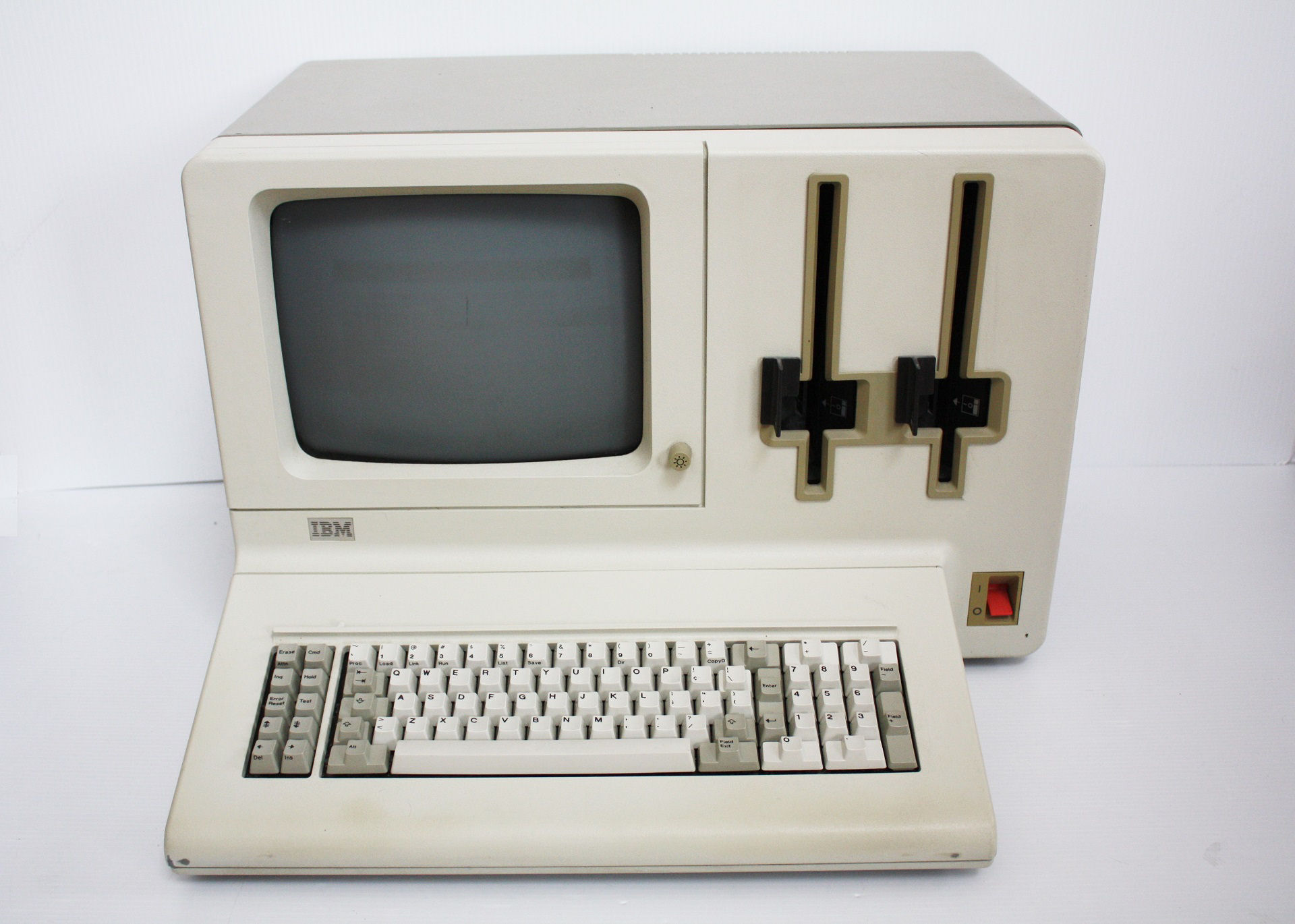
- Manufacturer: IBM
- Type: All-in-one (5322), Computer tower (5324)
- Released: July 1981
- Introductory price: US$9,000 (equivalent to $31,872 in 2025)
- Discontinued: 1985
- Operating system: System/34 BASIC
- CPU: Intel 8085 @ 3.07 MHz
- Memory: 32 KB,64 KB,96 KB,128 KB DRAM; 112/128 KB ROM
- Removable storage: 0-2 internal 8-inch floppy disk drives, optional external floppy drives
- Display: Green phosphor CRT display (80 × 24 text)
- Graphics: Intel 8275
- Sound: Internal beeper
- Input: Model F keyboard
- Connectivity: Printer port, disk drive port (optional), twinax (optional)
- Weight: 95 lb (43 kg)
- Predecessor: IBM 5120
- Successor: IBM Personal Computer
- Related: IBM Displaywriter System

The System/23 Datamaster (desktop model 5322 and tower model 5324) was an 8-bit microcomputer developed by IBM. Like the 6850 Displaywriter, it was one of the first IBM microcomputers, preceding the IBM Personal Computer (PC), with which it is incompatible. Launched in July 1981, the System/23 was IBM's most affordable computer until the PC was announced the following month, proving to be much more economical and popular.

== Description ==
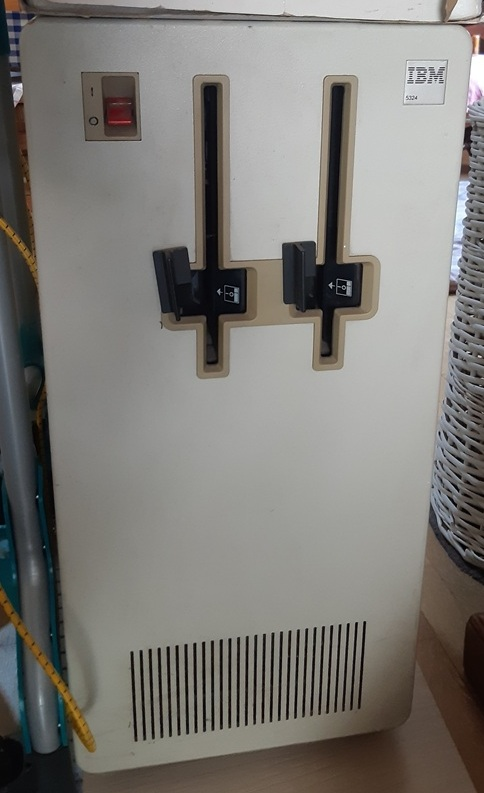
The 5324 is a tower model which has the monitor and the keyboard separate from the processing unit

The Datamaster was IBM's only 8-bit microcomputer and one of the few to use the EBCDIC encoding.

Model 5322 is an integrated unit with a CRT screen, keyboard, processor, memory and up to two internal 8-inch floppy drive units. Model 5324, labelled "ergonomic", is tower-based and contains the same components as the 5322 except for screen and keyboard. Internally, both models use the same motherboard.

=== Hardware ===
Its microprocessor is an Intel 8085 clocked at 3.07 MHz, with a bank system that enables allocation of 272 KB ROM and 128 KB RAM. The computer has four internal expansion slots.

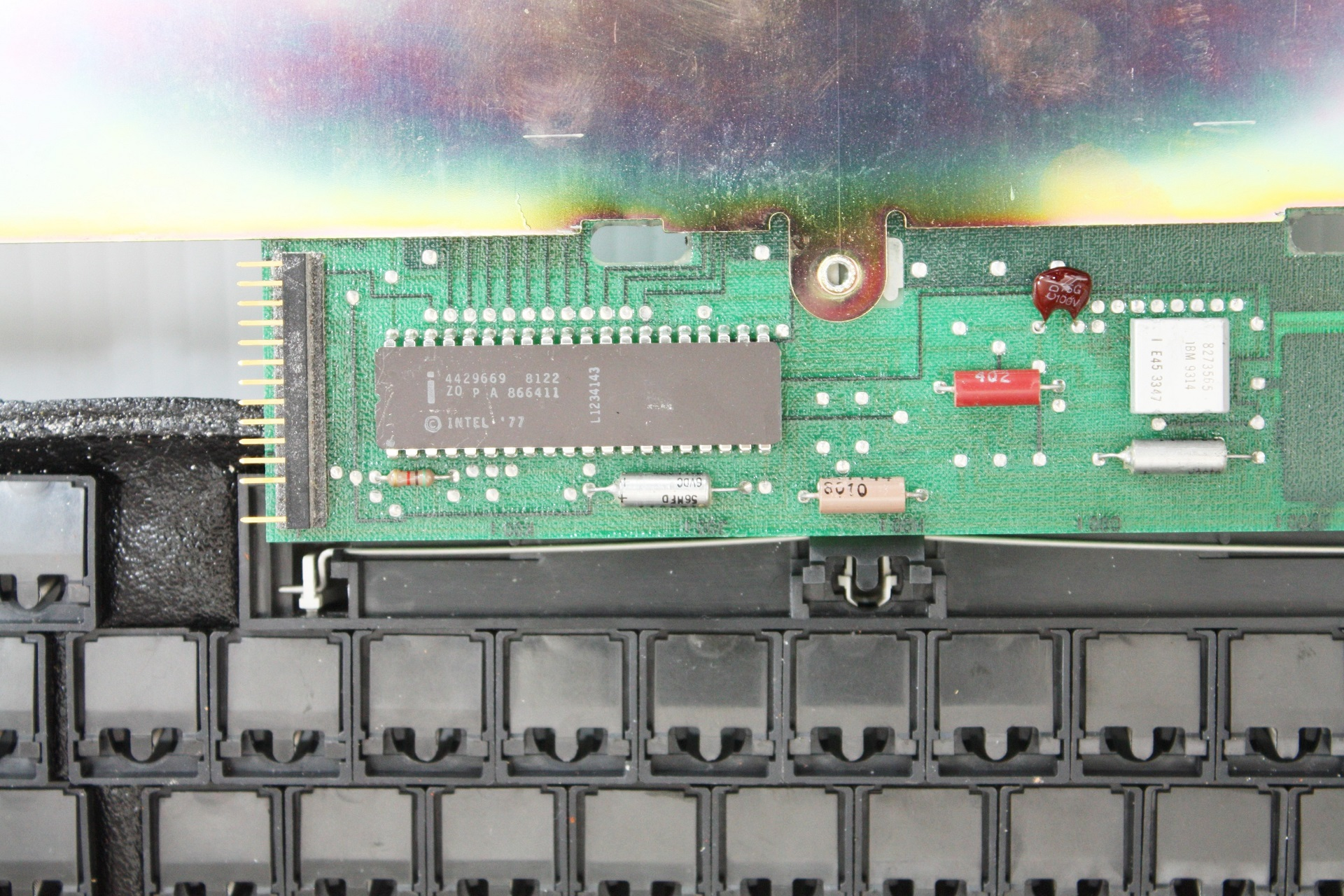
Intel 8048 microcontroller relabeled with IBM reference.

Design and development of this machine was made mostly using off-the-shelf integrated circuits of that time. This means they used microprocessor and support ICs which were available on the market, particularly the 7400 series of support chips. This marked a radical change for IBM, which previously had always used their own semiconductor families (like the SLT family). Even so, in order to deter third parties from producing clones, all components were relabelled with internal references determined by the company. This component redesignation is the main issue repairing this kind of machines, and as a consequence a large number of units remain with faults.

This system's read-only memory originally used fourteen 8KB memory modules, for a total of 112KB. Not long after entering production, the computer was patched and two more memories of the same capacity were added to the motherboard, giving the system a total capacity of 128 KB. ROS, IBM's term to refer this kind of memory, Is numerated in order to be identified during the diagnostics. The Datamaster's ROM memory is prone to corruption during its ageing process.

Unlike other microcomputers from the era, the System/23 uses 9-bit RAM instead of the simpler 8-bit one. This is due to the use of the ninth bit to store parity data. This storage is part of an error-detection mechanism that is used to detect errors in the memory during runtime. In case of finding such an error, the system generates an interrupt and is halted. Another distinctive trait is that the motherboard contains no RAM, because it is contained in one of two boards that contain the required integrated circuits. Whilst the maximum RAM capacity the computer can manage is 272 KB, the detection and identification system limits the computer to 128 KB. The available capacities for the memory boards are 32 KB and 64 KB respectively. This implies that the memory capacity for this computer is between 32 KB and 128 KB in increments of 32 KB, being the most common configuration 64 KB. In fact, there are various submodels according of the memory capacity and floppy drive units and type. Finally, it is necessary to explain that the integrated circuits employed in its RAM are unusual in the sense that they are piggybacked, fact that spread rumors that the memory was redundant when in fact they are a variant of the TMS4116, the TMS4132.

The video subsystem of this computer is based on the Intel 8275. This component has the responsibility to generate sync signals, among other functions. The section is almost copied from the datasheet of this component. As a curiosity, it has support for light pen, and it has a mechanism to simulate it during diagnostics. The video memory is not dedicated, unlike integrated circuit-based computers such as the TMS9918 or similar. The symbols are defined in a character generator which consists of eight pages (one per region/language supported) of 128 glyphs each. The 128 character limit is due to the width of the internal queues of the 8275, which uses seven bits to define a character. Those pages are selected according to the jumper configuration on the motherboard, but this is done by the software and it can therefore be changed in runtime. The screen field is 80 columns wide by 24 rows high.

The presence of a DMA controller is not frequent in 8-bit computers. This had to be added due to the incapacity of the CRTC of generate video addresses. In fact, this part requires a DMA controller in order to operate. In the Datamaster the DMA controller is the Intel 8257 and also has a dedicated channel to floppy drive transactions.

The Datamaster's Model F keyboard is based around the Intel 8048. It communicates with an Intel 8255 through a parallel bus. The technology of the matrix is capacitive. It has 83 keys. During initialization, the computer expects the keyboard to send a verification code to announce its presence; the diagnostics fail otherwise.

The system includes a dedicated diagnostics port which assists repairs. This was used in conjunction with a probe that showed the corresponding step code; its usage was required when the machine failed to initialize the video subsystem.

=== Software ===
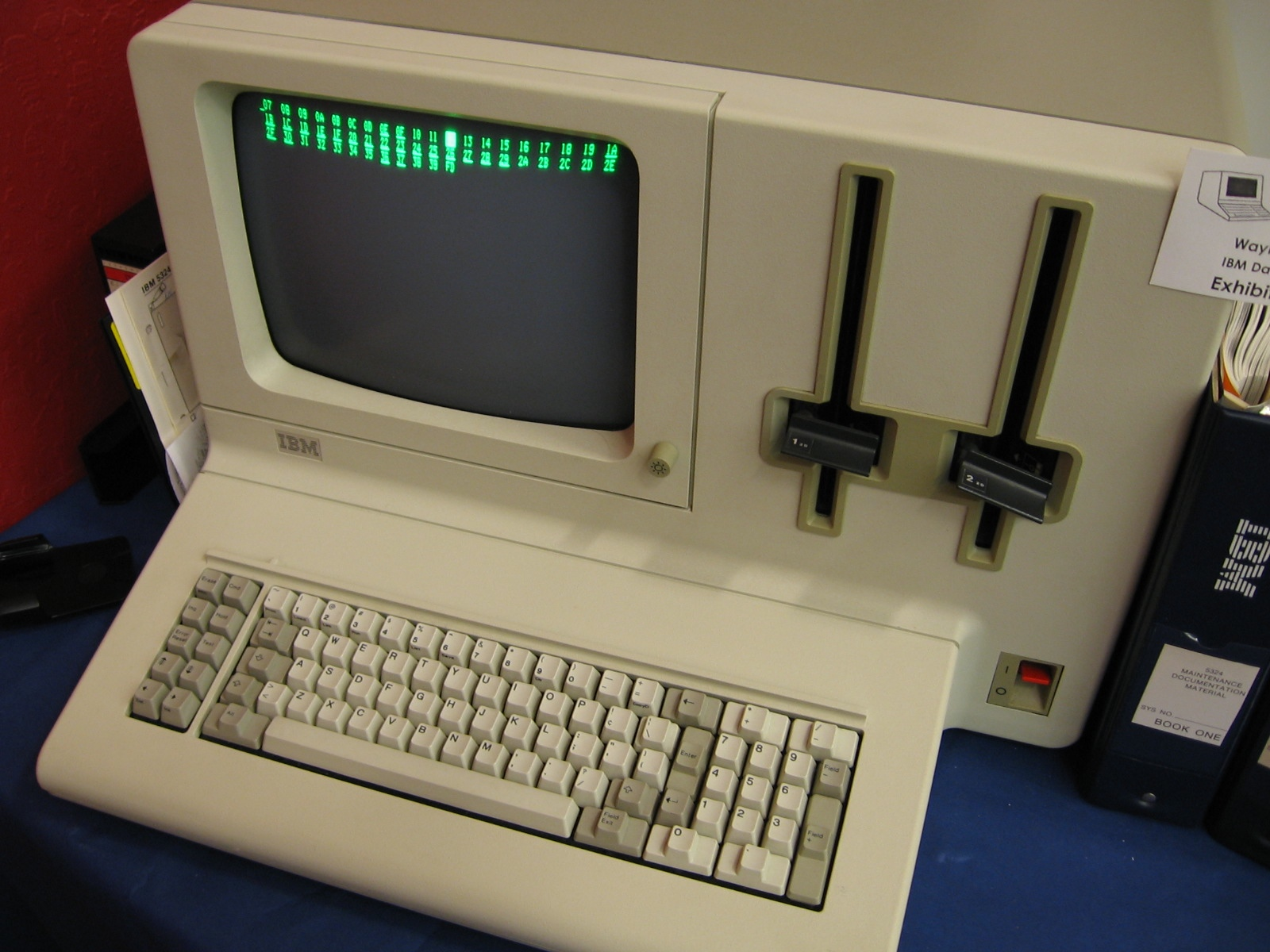
Diagnostics system of the System/23 Datamaster, displaying a ROM error (ROS 12h)

The Datamaster was conceived to be installed and operated without the need of specialists. For this reason it contained an embedded BASIC dialect. During the advanced stages of the project, IBM decided to fuse the extant BASIC implementation for the System/23 with the one from the System/34. This decision delayed the development for around a year. The Datamaster's BASIC is a closed environment, as it was decided the users wouldn't be able to access directly the hardware resources and as a consequence this dialect lacks low level commands such as PEEK and POKE. IBM did not provide the owners of the machine to program the computer at the low level, leaving interpreted BASIC as the only option.

A distinctive point for this microcomputer is its advanced diagnostics firmware. The checks are done on the CPU, RAM, ROM and all the main integrated circuits that are present in the motherboard. This set of routines are called PID-1200 or POD, according to the diagnostics and service manuals, respectively. These procedures show the results through the screen whenever possible, and through a probe otherwise. This firmware is accurate enough to pinpoint a failing memory and it could also determine if it is present or is missing under certain circumstances.

== Influence on later IBM systems ==
The ease of the design team which was gained through the Datamaster and Displaywriter projects influenced the decision to select an Intel CPU for their next microcomputer design. The delay caused by the decision to fuse both BASIC versions was the main lead to use Microsoft BASIC for the 5150 PC. Another of the reasons was due to the popularity of the latter.

Many hardware components, specifically the 8253 timer and the 8259 interrupt controller, were reused in the later IBM PC. The DMA controller was replaced by the 8237, an improvement over the 8257 used in the System/23. The RAM memory width and parity check mechanism remained the same, though the memory type changed between projects. The same memory modules used in the Datamaster later appeared in the early official RAM expansions. The computer's expansion bus, later known as the ISA bus, was based in its Datamaster counterpart, with only five signals being changed. Contrary to rumors, the Datamaster bus is not mirrored; it is a comprehension error caused by the service manual of the computer, which shows it mirrored. The Datamaster's keyboard, which uses a similar layout as the 5251, was reused in the PC, albeit with a serial interface instead of the original parallel one.

Although not code-compatible, the diagnostics system was ported to the PC and simplified, and was renamed to POST.

== Emulators ==
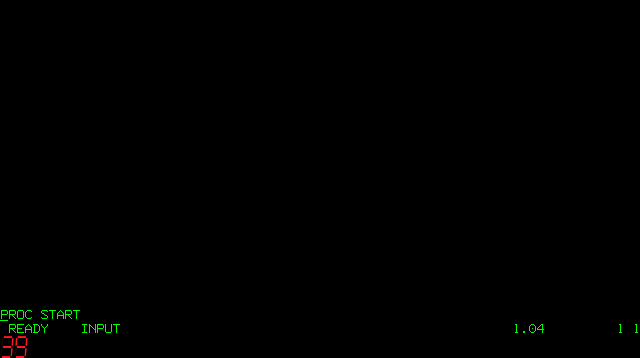
IBM System/23 Datamaster in MAME. The system prompt waits for the user to start typing BASIC.

Until the end of February, 2025 this computer did not have an emulator. Since then, it counts with a MAME driver that offers an incomplete emulation, with one of its biggest limitations being the floppy subsystem. Nevertheless is functional enough to be used with BASIC. The work still needs to be approved into the main MAME repository.

== Chronology ==
Timeline of the IBM Personal Computer

Asterisk (*) denotes a model released in Japan only
