= Keyboard technology =

Hardware technology of keyboards

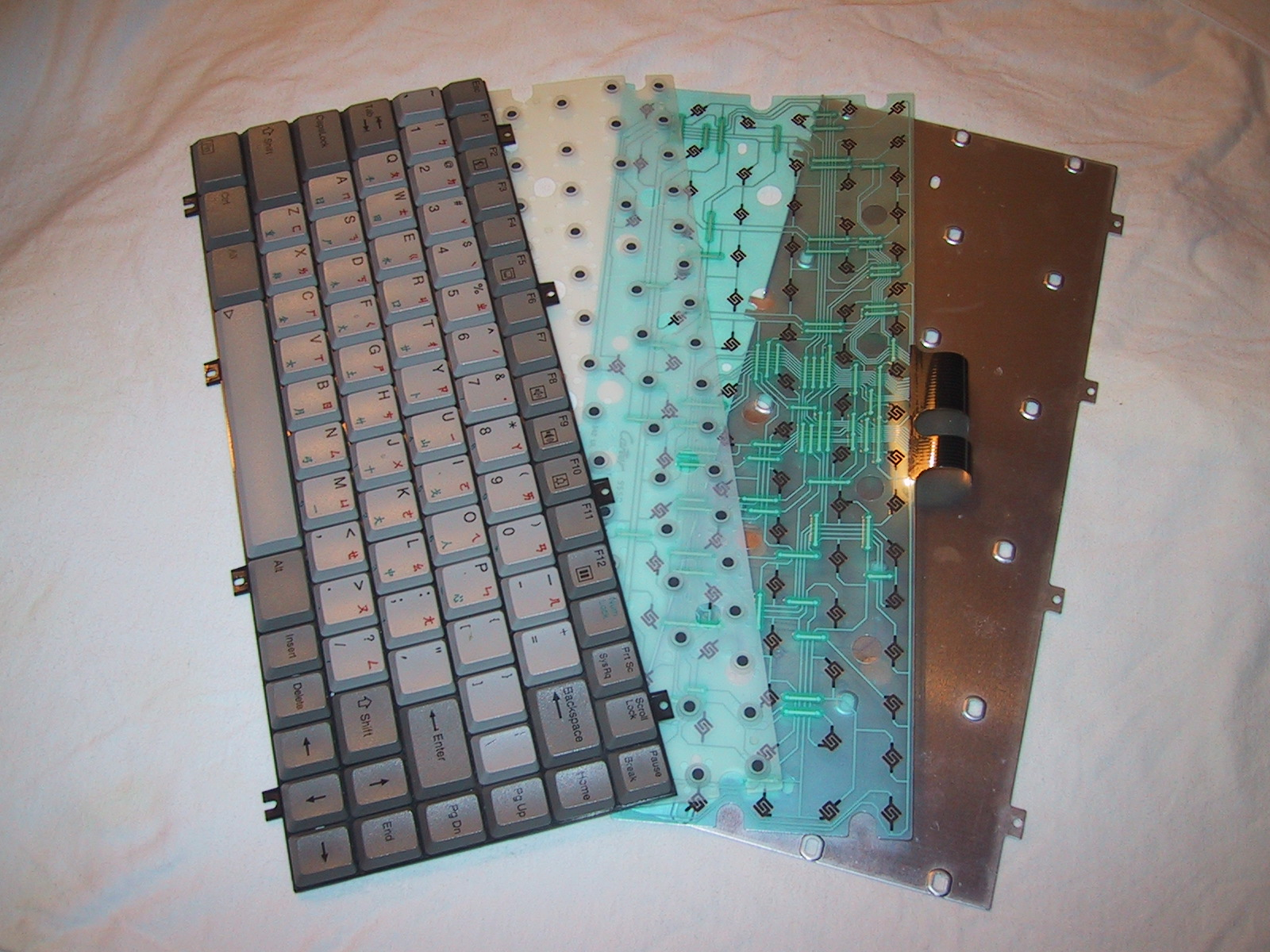
Keyboard construction of a typical notebook computer keyboard, in four layers

Modern computer keyboards are input devices designed to support human-machine interaction, where a human user can deliver their commands to a interactive program. The design and making of keyboards is a interdisciplinarity process where multiple fields of science are applied, including engineering, ergonomics, materials science, integrated circuit design, and more. Many different keyboard technologies have been developed to meet consumer demands and optimized for industrial applications. The standard full-size alphanumeric keyboard typically uses 101 to 105 individual keys, while ones integrated into a laptop tends to be less comprehensive.

Virtual keyboards, which are mostly accessed via a touchscreen interface, have no physical switches and provide artificial audio and haptic feedback instead. This variety of keyboard can prove useful, as it is not limited by the rigid nature of physical computer keyboards.

The majority of modern keyboards include a control processor and indicator lights to provide feedback to the user (and to the central processor) about what state the keyboard is in. Plug-and-play technology means that its "out of the box" layout can be notified to the system, making the keyboard immediately ready to use without the need for further configuration, unless the user so desires. This also enables manufacture of generic keyboards for a variety of language markets, that differ only in the symbols engraved on the keytops.

== Keystroke sensing ==
=== Membrane ===
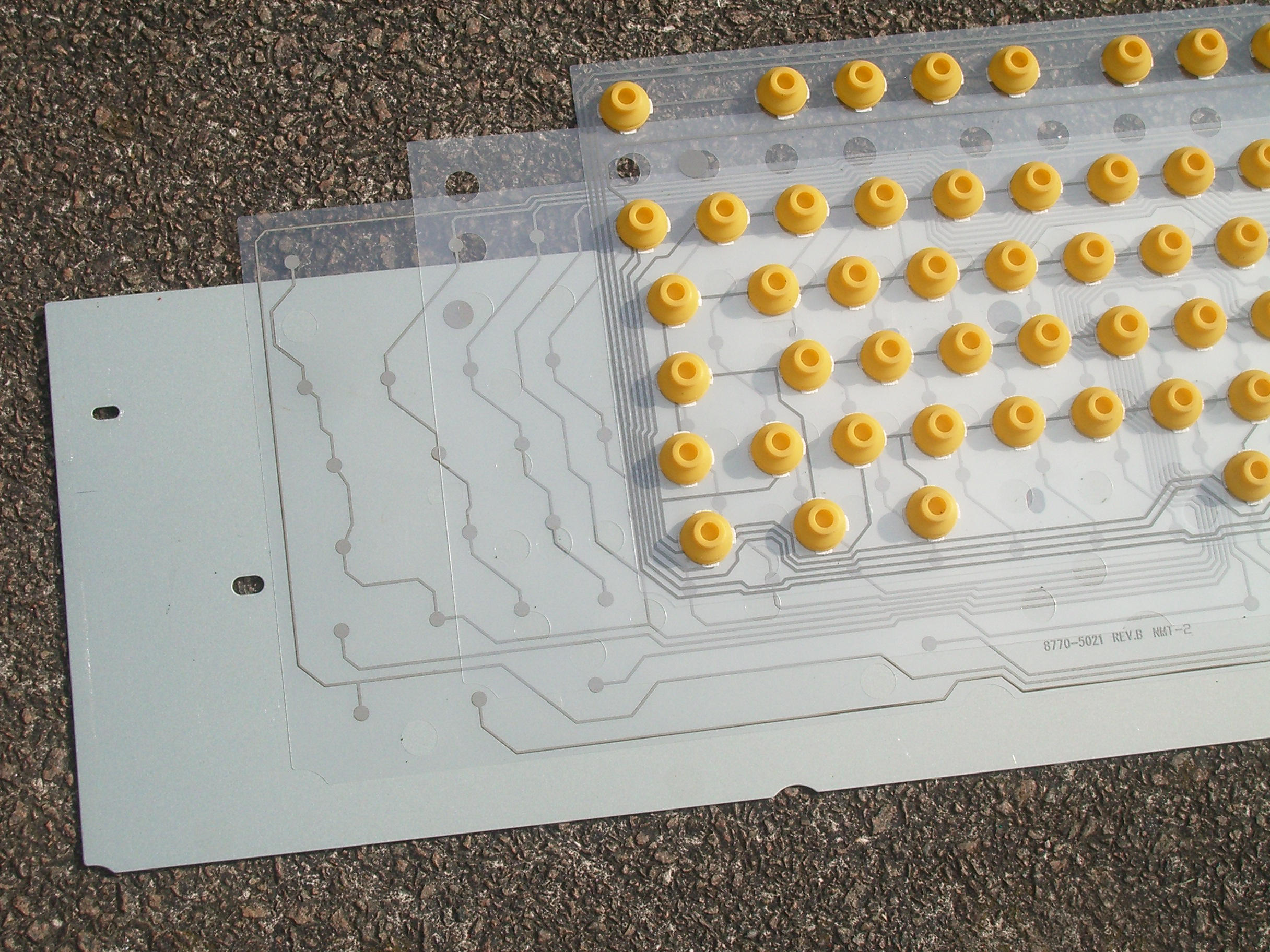
A typical membrane assembly

A common membrane design consists of three layers. The top and bottom layer have exposed electrical matrix traces, and the middle layer is a spacer to prevent current from passing through the top and bottom conductive traces passively. When pressure is applied to the top membrane, it bridges the top and bottom conductive contact pads, allowing current to transfer.

Two of the most common types of membrane keyboards include full-travel rubber dome over membrane and flat-panel membrane keyboards. Flat-panel membrane keyboards are most often found on appliances like microwave ovens or photocopiers.

==== Rubber dome over membrane ====
Exploded view of a typical rubber dome over membrane design

Full-travel rubber dome over membrane keyboards are the most common keyboard design manufactured today. In these keyboards, a rubber dome sheet is placed above the membranes, ensuring that the domes align with the contact pads. The rubber dome serves a dual purpose: it acts as a tactile return spring and provides a soft surface to transfer force onto the top membrane. To bridge the connection between the two contact pads, the rubber dome must be fully depressed.

Rubber dome over membrane keyboards became very popular with computer manufacturers as they sought to reduce costs while PC prices declined.

===== Scissor-switch =====
Scissor switch mechanism

A common, compact variant of rubber dome over membrane is the scissor-switch, based on the scissors mechanism. Due to the requirement of many laptops (or notebooks) to be slim, they require the keyboards to be low-profile. Therefore, this technology is most commonly featured on laptops. The keys are attached to the keyboard via two plastic pieces that interlock in a "scissor"-like fashion and snap to the keyboard and the keytop. These keyboards are generally quiet and the keys require little force to press.

Scissor-switch keyboards are typically slightly more expensive. They are harder to clean (due to the limited movement of the keys and their multiple attachment points) but also less likely to get debris in them as the gaps between the keys are often smaller (as there is no need for extra room to allow for the 'wiggle' in the key, as typically found on a membrane keyboard).

==== Flat-panel membrane ====
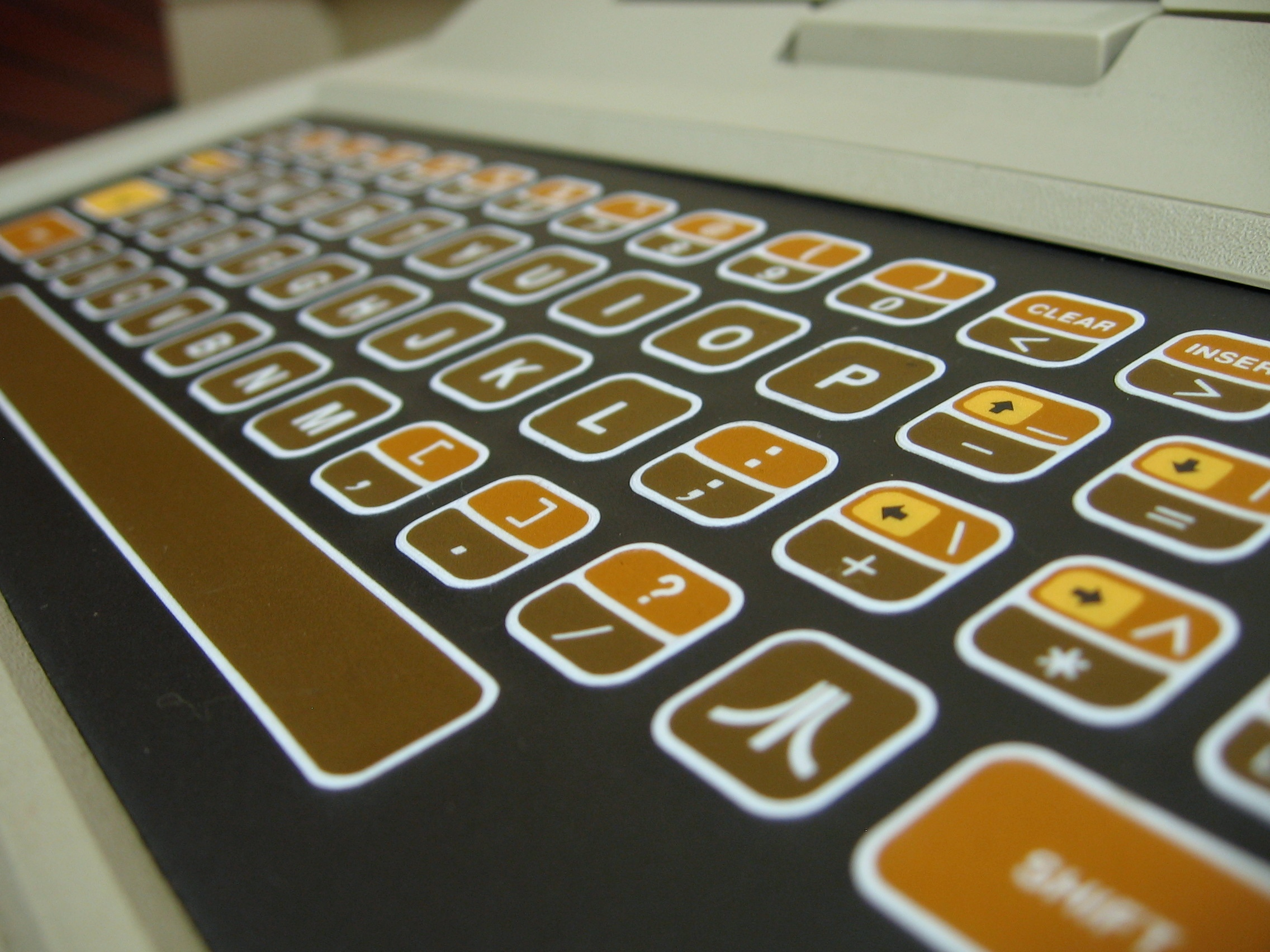
Atari 400 keyboard

Flat-panel membrane keyboards are often used in harsh environments where water or leak-proofing is desirable. They can have non-tactile, polydome tactile and metal dome tactile keys. Polydome tactile membrane switches use polyester, or PET, and is formed to create a stiff plastic dome. When the stiff polydome is pressed, the conductive ink on the back of the polydome connects with the bottom layer of the circuit. Metal dome membrane switches are made of stainless steel and offer enhanced durability and reliability and can feature custom dome designs. Non-tactile flat-panel membrane keyboards have little to no keypress feel and often issue a beep or flash of light on actuation.

Although this keyboard design was commonly used in the early days of the personal computer (on the Sinclair ZX80, ZX81, and Atari 400), they have been supplanted by more responsive and modern designs.

==== Roll-up keyboard ====
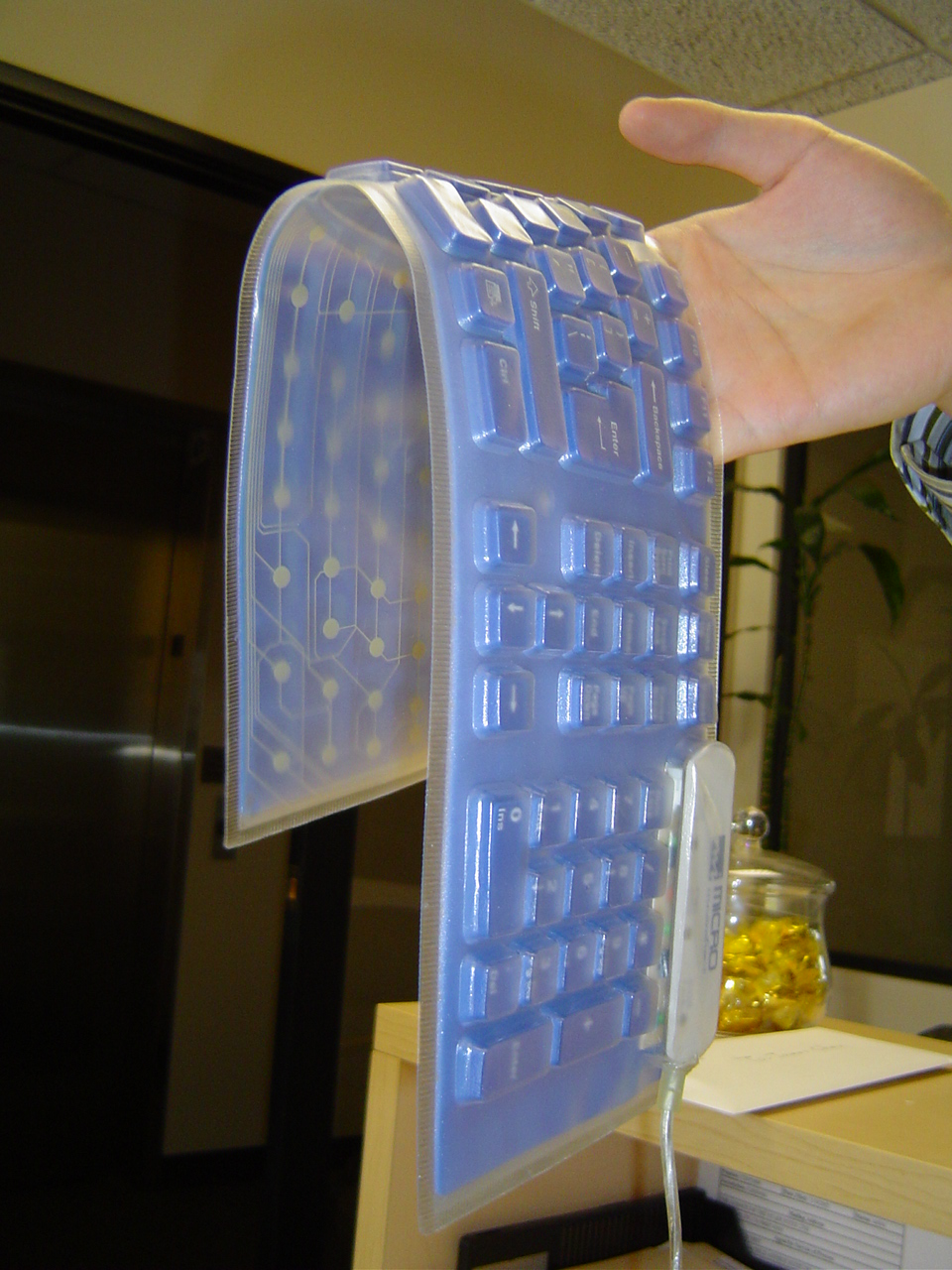
Most keyboards are rigid, but this keyboard is flexible.

Computer keyboards made of flexible silicone or polyurethane materials can roll up in a bundle. This type of keyboard can take advantage of the thin flexible plastic membranes, but still pose the risk of damage. When they are completely sealed in rubber, they are water resistant. Roll-up keyboards provide relatively little tactile feedback. Because these keyboards are typically made of silicone, they unfavorably tend to attract dirt, dust, and hair.

=== Metal contact ===
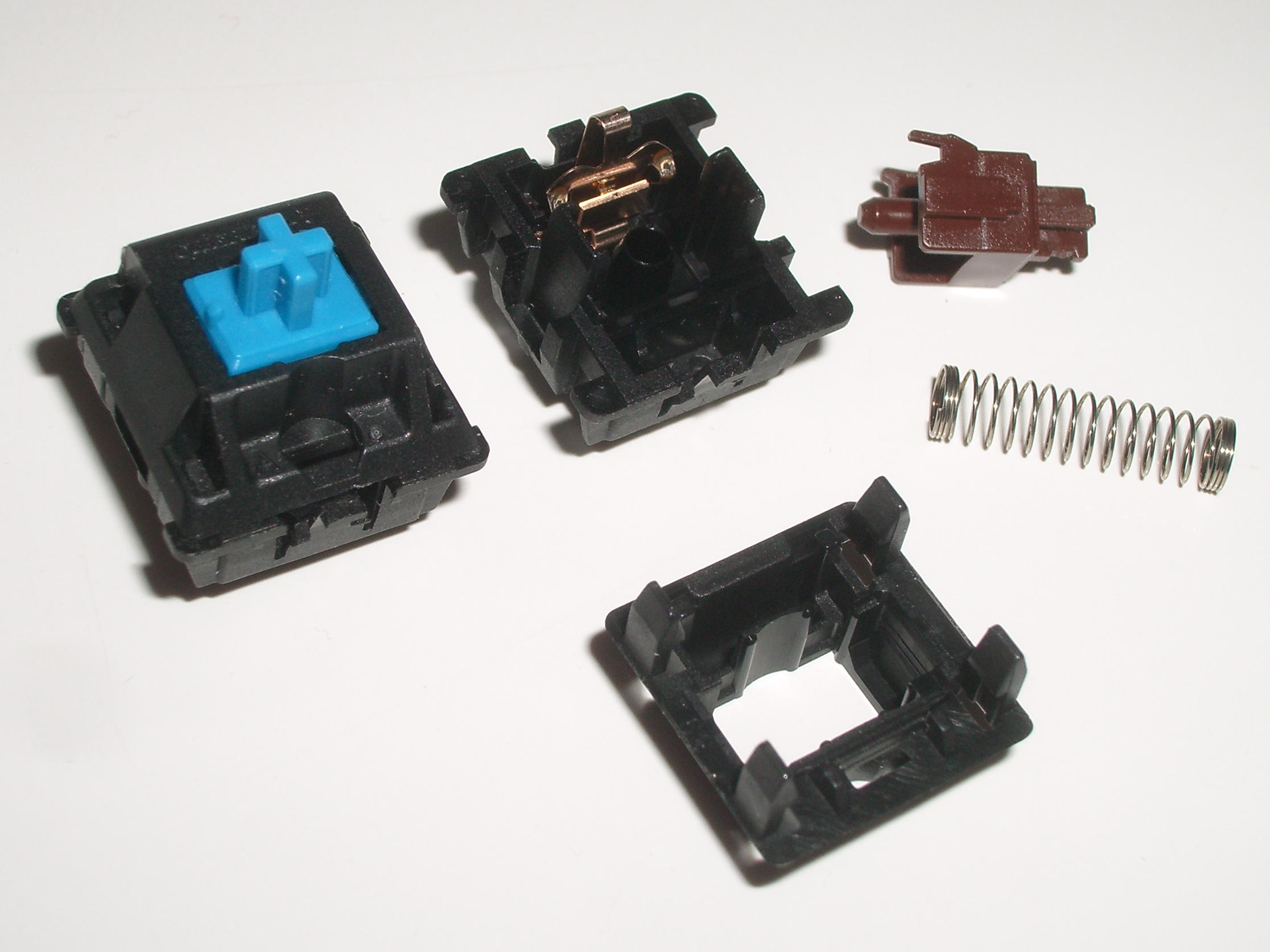
Cherry MX Blue (left) and disassembled Cherry MX Brown (right)

Keyboards which have metal contact switches typically use discrete modules for each key. This type of switch is usually composed of a housing, a spring, and a slider, and sometimes other parts such as a separate tactile leaf or clickbar.

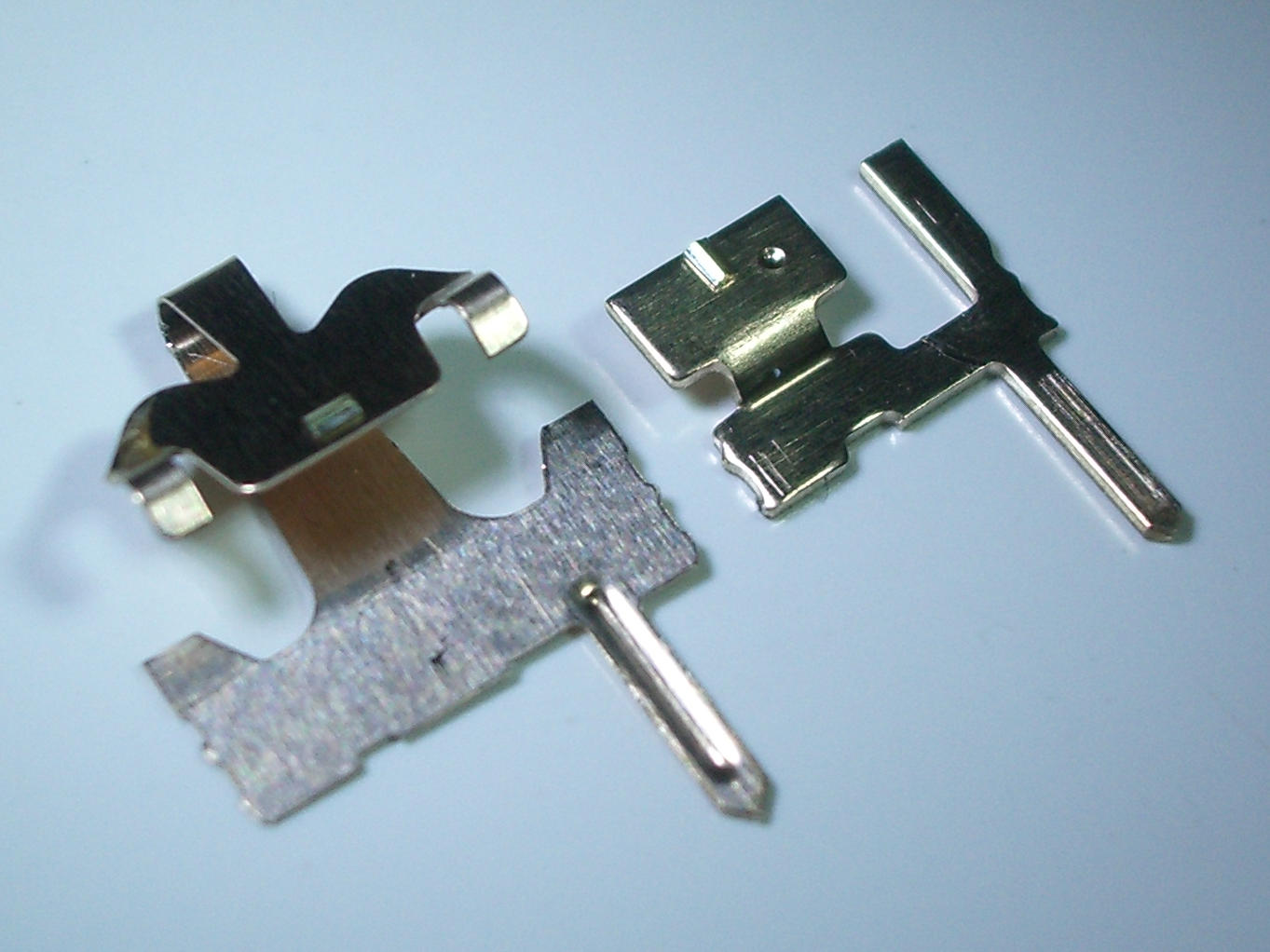
Cherry MX switch contacts

At rest, the metal contacts inside of the switch are held apart. As the switch is pressed down, the contacts are held together to conduct current for actuation. Many switch designs use gold for contact material to prolong the lifetime of the switch by preventing switch failure from oxidization. Most designs use a metal leaf, where the movable contact is a leaf spring.

Keyboards which utilize this technology are commonly referred to as "mechanical keyboards", but there is not a universally agreed-upon clear-cut definition for this term. Since the mid-2000s, mechanical keyboards are used by gamers and professionals again. Specialized types exist for laptops and thin keyboards.

A major producer of discrete metal contact switches is Cherry, which has manufactured the Cherry MX family of switches since the 1980s. Cherry's color-coding system of categorizing switches has been imitated by other switch manufacturers, such as Gateron and Kailh among many others.

==== Hot-swappable keyboard ====
Hot-swappable keyboards are keyboards in which switches can be pulled out and replaced without requiring the typical solder connection. Instead of the switch pins being directly soldered to the keyboard's printed circuit board (PCB), hot-swap sockets are instead soldered on. Hot-swap sockets can allow users to change different switches out of the keyboard without having the tools or knowledge required to solder.

=== Reed ===
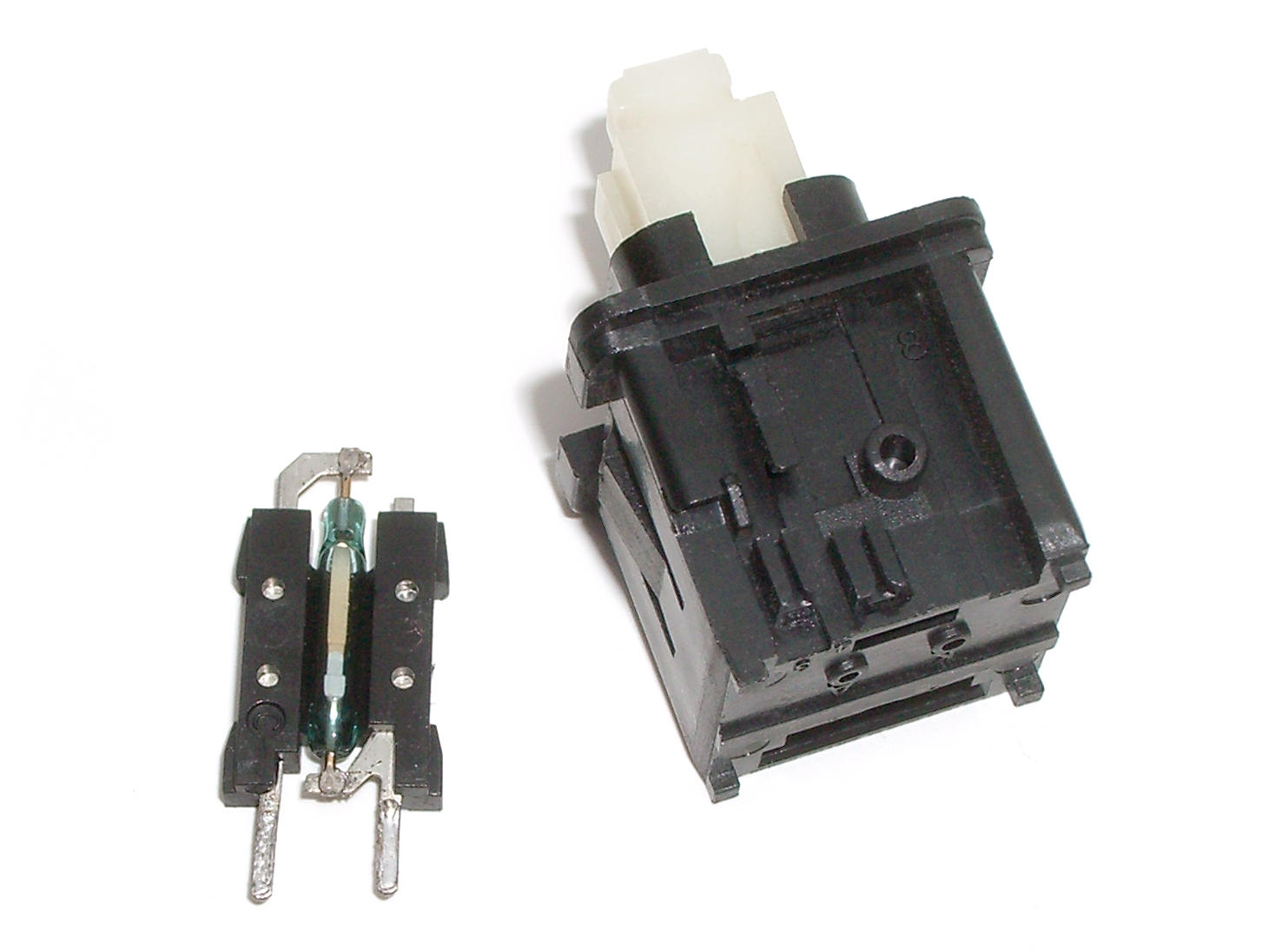
Reed switch with reed module removed

The reed module in a reed switch consists of two metal contacts inside of a glass bubble usually sealed with some inert gas like nitrogen to help prevent particle build-up. The slider in the housing pushes a magnet down in front of the reed capsule and the magnetic field causes the reed contacts to become attracted to each other and make contact. The reed switch mechanism was originally invented in 1936 by W B Ellwood at Bell Telephone Laboratories.

Although reed switches use metal leaf contacts, they are considered separate from all other forms of metal contact switch because the contacts are operated magnetically instead of using physical force from a slider to be pressed together.

=== Capacitive ===
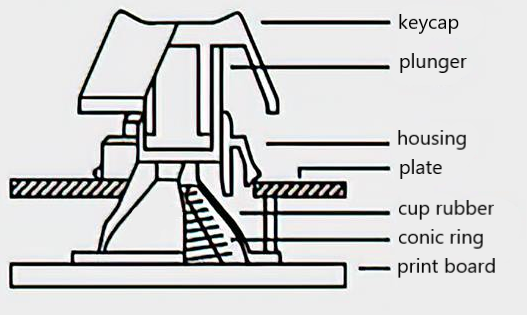
Topre electrostatic capacitive switch

In a capacitive mechanism, pressing a key changes the capacitance of a pattern of capacitor pads. The pattern consists of two D-shaped capacitor pads for each switch, printed on a PCB and covered by a thin, insulating film of soldermask which acts as a dielectric.

For the most common, foam and foil implementation of this technology, the movable part ends with a flat foam element about the size of an aspirin tablet, finished with aluminum foil. Opposite the switch is a PCB with the capacitor pads. When the key is pressed, the foil tightly clings to the surface of the PCB, forming a daisy chain of two capacitors between contact pads and itself separated with a thin soldermask, and thus "shorting" the contact pads with an easily detectable drop of capacitive reactance between them. Usually, this permits a pulse or pulse train to be sensed.

An advantage of the capacitive technology is that the switch is not dependent on the flow of current through metal contacts to actuate. There is no debouncing necessary.

The sensor tells enough about the distance of the keypress to allow the user to adjust the actuation point (key sensitivity). This adjustment can be done with the help of the bundled software and individually for each key, if so implemented. A keyboard which utilizes these abilities include the Real Force RGB.

IBM's Model F keyboard consists of a buckling spring over a capacitive PCB. The later Model M used the same buckling-spring mechanism but with membrane sensing in place of the capacitive PCB.

The Topre Corporation design for switches uses a conical spring below a rubber dome. The dome provides resistance, while the spring does the capacitive action.

=== Hall effect ===
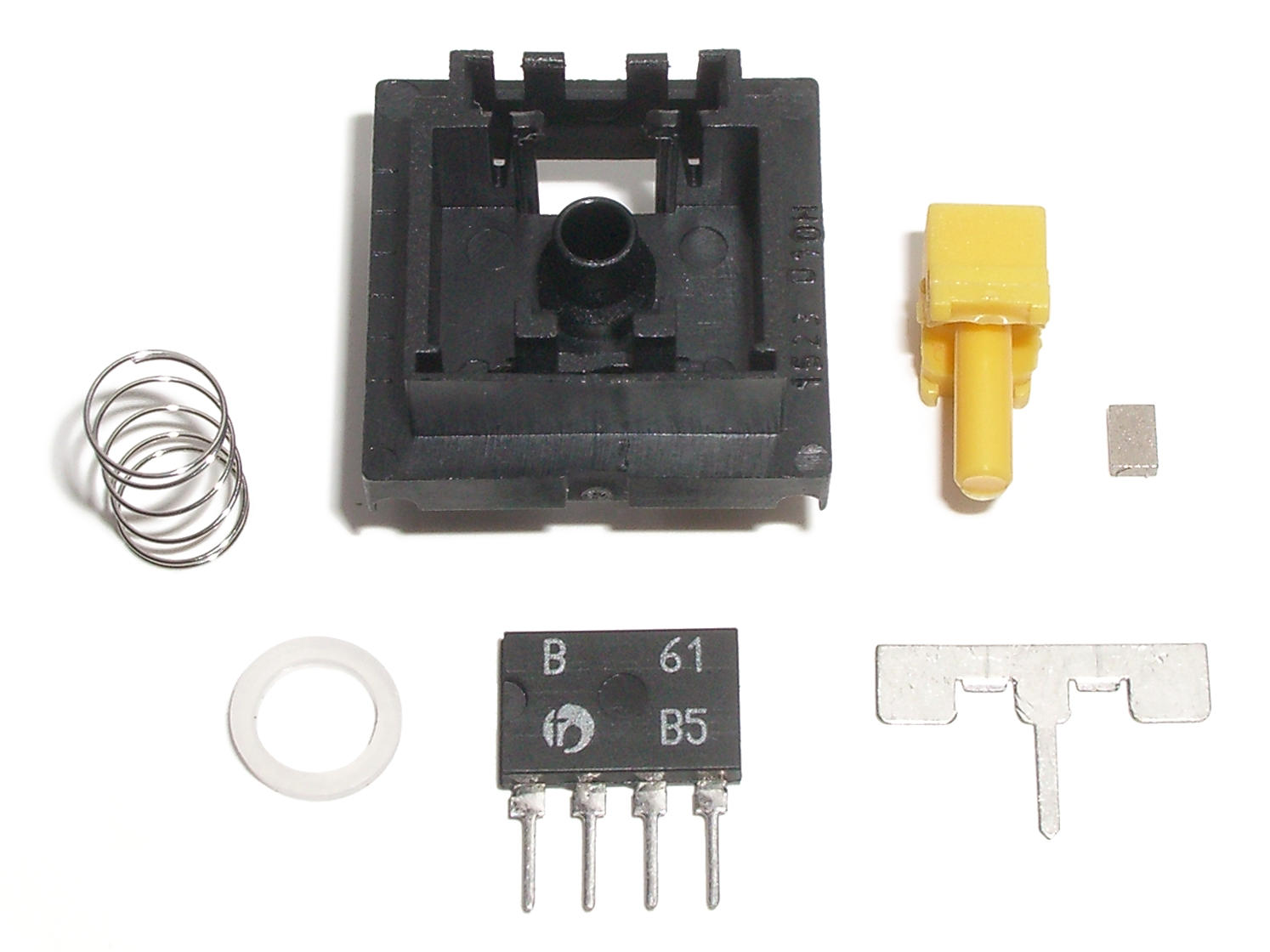
RAFI RS 76 C 010 Hall-effect switch fully disassembled

Hall-effect keyboards use Hall-effect sensors to detect the movement of a magnet by the potential difference in voltage. When a key is depressed, it moves a magnet that is detected by a solid-state sensor. Because they require no physical contact for actuation, Hall-effect keyboards are extremely reliable and can accept millions of keystrokes before failing. They can easily be made totally waterproof, and can resist large amounts of dust and contaminants. Because a magnet and sensor are required for each key, as well as custom control electronics, they are expensive to manufacture.

A hall switch works through magnetic fields. Every switch has a small magnet fixed inside it. When the electricity passes through the main circuit, it creates a magnetic flux. Every time a key is pressed, the magnetic intensity changes. This change is noticed by the circuit and the sensors send the information to the motherboard.

In modern gaming keyboards, magnetic Hall-effect switches have gained popularity in competitive esports due to features such as adjustable actuation points (ranging from 0.1 mm to 4.0 mm) and "Rapid Trigger" technology, which allows instantaneous key reset upon upward finger movement without needing to pass a static mechanical reset threshold.

=== Optical ===
Optical switch technology was introduced in 1962 by Harley E. Kelchner for use in a typewriter machine with the purpose of reducing the noise generated by typewriter keys.

An optical keyboard technology utilizes light-emitting devices and photo sensors to optically detect actuated keys, offering faster response times and eliminating the need for physical contact between moving parts. Most commonly the emitters and sensors are located at the perimeter, mounted on a small PCB. The light is directed from side to side of the keyboard interior, and it can only be blocked by the actuated keys. Most optical keyboards require at least two beams (most commonly a vertical beam and a horizontal beam) to determine the actuated key. Some optical keyboards use a special key structure that blocks the light in a certain pattern, allowing only one beam per row of keys (most commonly a horizontal beam).

The mechanism of the optical keyboard is very simple – a light beam is sent from the emitter to the receiving sensor, and the actuated key blocks, reflects, refracts or otherwise interacts with the beam, resulting in an identified key.

A major advantage of optical switch technology is that it is very resistant to moisture, dust, and debris because there are no metal contacts that can corrode. This technology has been used in some laptops.

The specialist DataHand keyboard uses optical technology to sense keypresses with a single light beam and sensor per key. The keys are held in their rest position by magnets; when the magnetic force is overcome to press a key, the optical path is unblocked and the keypress is registered.

=== Laser projection ===
A laser projection device approximately the size of a computer mouse projects the outline of keyboard keys onto a flat surface, such as a table or desk. This type of keyboard is portable enough to be easily used with PDAs and cellphones, and many models have retractable cords and wireless capabilities. However, this design is prone to error, as accidental disruption of the laser will generate unwanted keystrokes. This type of keyboard's inherent lack of tactile feedback makes it often undesirable.

== Switch mechanisms ==
=== Buckling spring ===
Illustration from the original buckling spring U.S. patent 4,118,611, issued to IBM in 1978

The buckling spring mechanism (now expired U.S. patent 4,118,611) atop the switch is responsible for the characteristic clicky response of the keyboard. This mechanism controls a small hammer that strikes a capacitive or membrane switch.

IBM's Model F keyboard series was the first to employ buckling spring key-switches, which used capacitive sensing to actuate. The original patent was never employed in an actual production keyboard but it establishes the basic premise of a buckling spring.

The IBM Model M is a large family of computer keyboards created by IBM that began in late 1983 when IBM patented a membrane buckling spring key-switch design. The main intent of this design was to halve the production cost of the Model F. The most well known full-size Model M is known officially as the IBM Enhanced Keyboard.

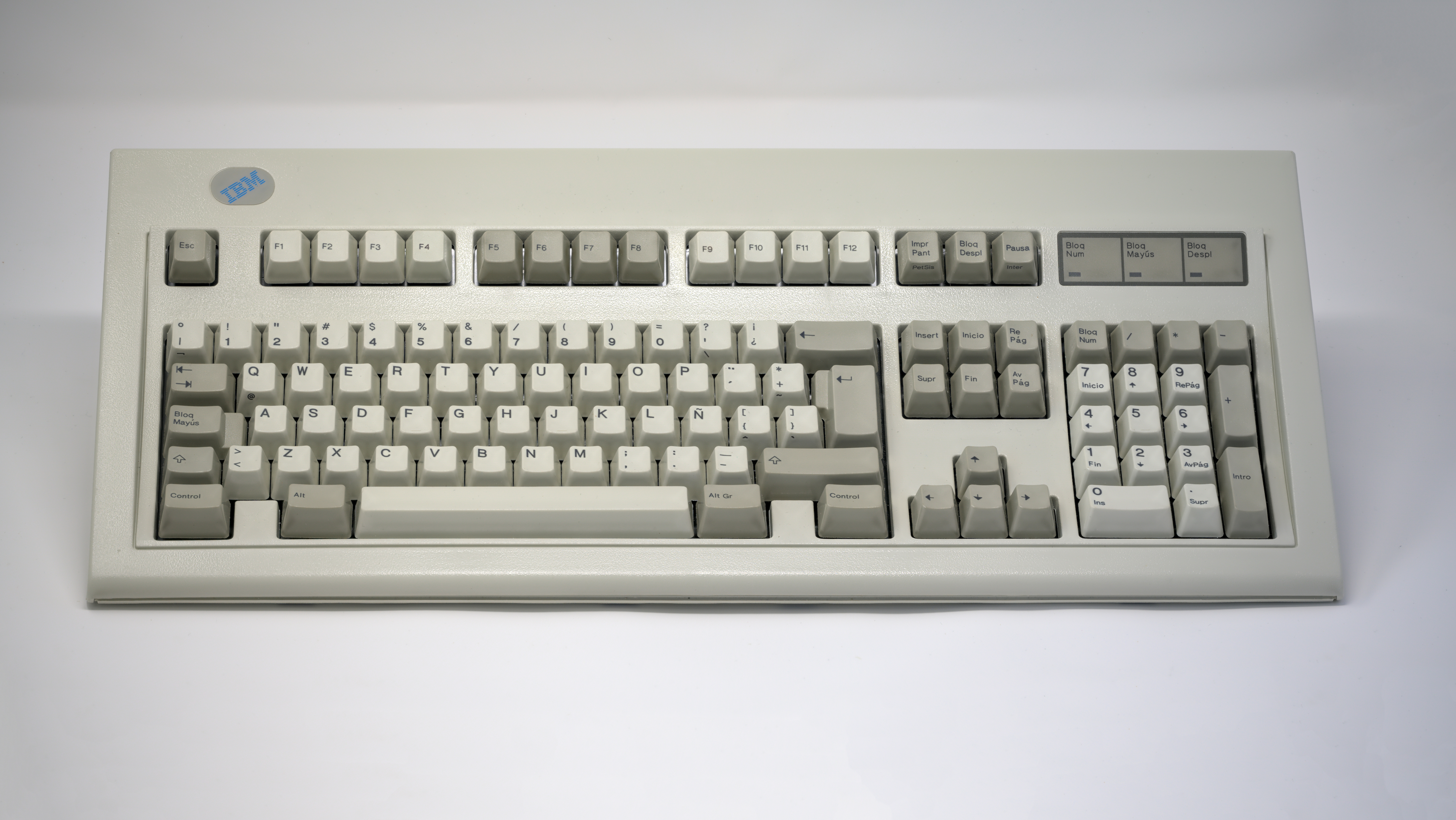
A classic full-size Model M keyboard with Spanish ISO key layout

In 1993, two years after spawning Lexmark, IBM transferred its keyboard operations to the daughter company. New Model M keyboards continued to be manufactured for IBM by Lexmark until 1996, when Unicomp was established and purchased the keyboard patents and tooling equipment to continue their production.

IBM continued to make Model M's in their Scotland factory until 1999.

== Debouncing ==
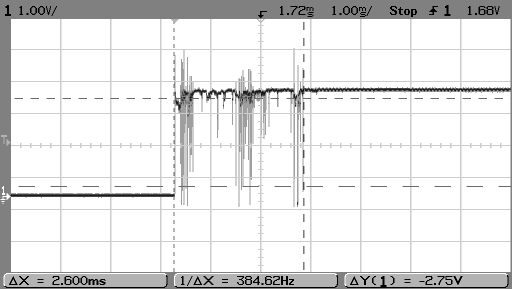
Snapshot of switch bounce on an oscilloscope. The switch bounces between on and off several times before settling.

When a key is pressed, it oscillates (bounces) against its contacts several times before settling. When released, it oscillates again until it comes to rest. Although it happens on a scale too small to be visible to the naked eye, it can be enough to register multiple keystrokes.

To resolve this, the processor in a keyboard debounces the keystrokes, by averaging the signal over time to produce one "confirmed" keystroke that (usually) corresponds to a single press or release. Early membrane keyboards had limited typing speed because they had to do significant debouncing. This was a noticeable problem on the ZX81.

== Keycaps ==
Keytops are used on full-travel keyboards. While modern keytops are typically surface-printed, they can also be double-shot molded, laser marked, dye sublimation printed, engraved, or made of transparent material with printed paper inserts. There are also "keycaps" which utilize thin shells that are placed over keytop bases, which were used on several IBM PC keyboards. A more modern but rare innovation is the OLED key which, on some specialty devices like stream controller keytops, feature a tiny OLED display under each keytop, which can be customized in software to display any icon or glyph the user wishes. Due to high cost most of these devices are not full keyboards for typing but are meant for shortcuts for launching applications or macro commands for other programs.

Switches allow for the removal and replacement of keytops with a common stem type.

== Stabilizers ==
Almost all keyboards which utilize keys two or more units in length (such as the typical space bar or enter key) use stabilizers to ensure consistent movement and prevent key wobble during typing. Various lubricants and padding techniques can be used to reduce the rattle and ticking of components.

== Other parts ==
A modern PC keyboard typically includes a control processor and indicator lights to provide feedback to the user about what state the keyboard is in. Depending on the sophistication of the controller's programming, the keyboard may also offer other special features. The processor is usually a single chip 8048 microcontroller variant. The keyboard switch matrix is wired to its inputs and it processes the incoming keystrokes and sends the results down a serial cable (the keyboard cord) to a receiver in the main computer box. It also controls the illumination of the "caps lock", "num lock" and "scroll lock" lights.

A common test for whether the computer has crashed is pressing the "caps lock" key. The keyboard sends the key code to the keyboard driver running in the main computer; if the main computer is operating, it commands the light to turn on. All the other indicator lights work in a similar way. The keyboard driver also tracks the shift, alt and control state of the keyboard.

== Keyboard switch matrix ==
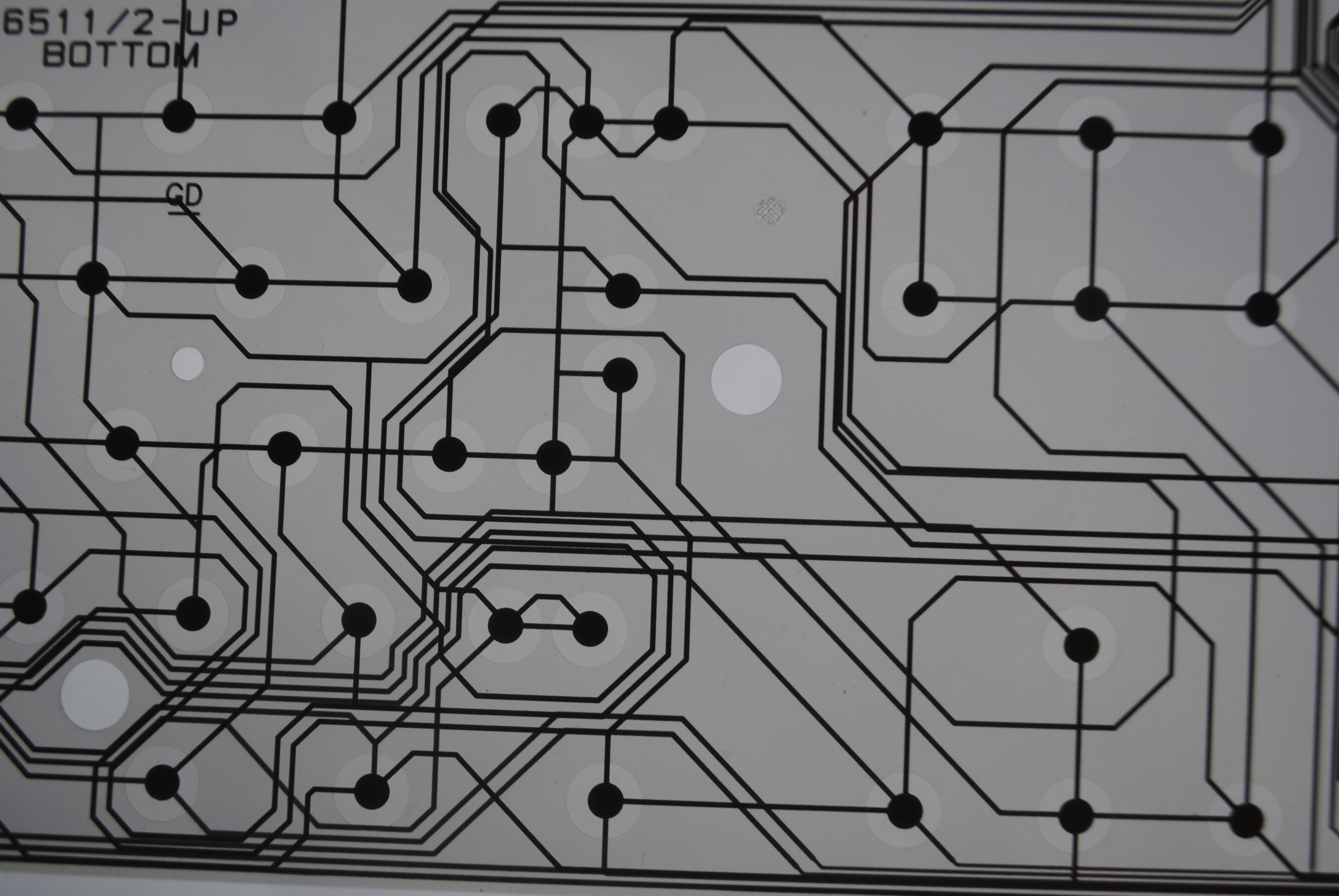
A close-up of a keyboard matrix circuit printed onto a flexible transparent PET sheet

The keyboard switch matrix is often drawn with horizontal wires and vertical wires in a grid which is called a matrix circuit. It has a switch at some or all intersections, much like a multiplexed display. By 2025, Hall-effect (magnetic) switches became a mainstream alternative to traditional mechanical contacts, allowing for 'Rapid Trigger' features where the reset point is dynamic based on the key's upward travel rather than a fixed physical point.

=== Ghost keys ===
Almost all keyboards have only the switch (but no diode) at each intersection, which causes "ghost keys" and "key jamming" when multiple keys are pressed (rollover). Certain, often more expensive, keyboards have a diode between each intersection, allowing the keyboard microcontroller to accurately sense any number of simultaneous keys being pressed, without generating erroneous ghost keys.

== Alternative text-entering methods ==
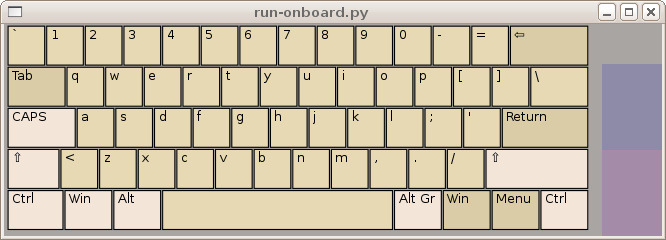
On-screen keyboard controlled with the mouse can be used by users with limited mobility.

Optical character recognition (OCR) is preferable to rekeying for converting existing text that is already written down but not in machine-readable format (for example, a Linotype-composed book from the 1940s). In other words, to convert the text from an image to editable text (that is, a string of character codes), a person could re-type it, or a computer could look at the image and deduce what each character is. OCR technology has already reached an impressive state (for example, Google Book Search) and promises more for the future.

Speech recognition converts speech into machine-readable text (that is, a string of character codes). This technology has also reached an advanced state and is implemented in various software products. For certain uses (e.g., transcription of medical or legal dictation; journalism; writing essays or novels) speech recognition is starting to replace the keyboard. However, the lack of privacy when issuing voice commands and dictation makes this kind of input unsuitable for many environments.

Pointing devices can be used to enter text or characters in contexts where using a physical keyboard would be inappropriate or impossible. These accessories typically present characters on a display, in a layout that provides fast access to the more frequently used characters or character combinations.

== Other issues ==
=== Keystroke logging ===
Unencrypted Bluetooth keyboards are known to be vulnerable to signal theft for keylogging by other Bluetooth devices in range. Microsoft wireless keyboards 2011 and earlier are documented to have this vulnerability.

Keystroke logging (often called keylogging) is a method of capturing and recording user keystrokes. While it can be used legally to measure employee activity, or by law enforcement agencies to investigate suspicious activities, it is also used by hackers for illegal or malicious acts. Hackers use keyloggers to obtain passwords or encryption keys.

Keystroke logging can be achieved by both hardware and software means. Hardware key loggers are attached to the keyboard cable or installed inside standard keyboards. Software keyloggers work on the target computer's operating system and gain unauthorized access to the hardware, hook into the keyboard with functions provided by the OS, or use remote access software to transmit recorded data out of the target computer to a remote location. Some hackers also use wireless keylogger sniffers to collect packets of data being transferred from a wireless keyboard and its receiver, and then they crack the encryption key being used to secure wireless communications between the two devices.

Anti-spyware applications are able to detect many keyloggers and remove them. Responsible vendors of monitoring software support detection by anti-spyware programs, thus preventing abuse of the software. Enabling a firewall does not stop keyloggers per se, but can possibly prevent transmission of the logged material over the net if properly configured. Network monitors (also known as reverse-firewalls) can be used to alert the user whenever an application attempts to make a network connection. This gives the user the chance to prevent the keylogger from "phoning home" with their typed information. Automatic form-filling programs can prevent keylogging entirely by not using the keyboard at all. Most keyloggers can be fooled by alternating between typing the login credentials and typing characters somewhere else in the focus window.

Keyboards are also known to emit electromagnetic signatures that can be detected using special spying equipment to reconstruct the keys pressed on the keyboard. Neal O'Farrell, executive director of the Identity Theft Council, revealed to InformationWeek that "More than 25 years ago, a couple of former spooks showed me how they could capture a user's ATM PIN, from a van parked across the street, simply by capturing and decoding the electromagnetic signals generated by every keystroke," O'Farrell said. "They could even capture keystrokes from computers in nearby offices, but the technology wasn't sophisticated enough to focus in on any specific computer."

=== Physical injury ===
The use of a keyboard may cause serious injury (such as carpal tunnel syndrome or other repetitive strain injuries) to the hands, wrists, arms, neck or back. The risks of injuries can be reduced by taking frequent short breaks to get up and walk around a couple of times every hour. Users should also vary tasks throughout the day, to avoid overuse of the hands and wrists. When typing on a keyboard, a person should keep the shoulders relaxed with the elbows at the side, with the keyboard and mouse positioned so that reaching is not necessary. The chair height and keyboard tray should be adjusted so that the wrists are straight, and the wrists should not be rested on sharp table edges. Wrist or palm rests should not be used while typing.

Some adaptive technology ranging from special keyboards, mouse replacements and pen tablet interfaces to speech recognition software can reduce the risk of injury. Pause software reminds the user to pause frequently. Switching to a much more ergonomic mouse, such as a vertical mouse or joystick mouse may provide relief.

By using a touchpad or a stylus pen with a graphic tablet, in place of a mouse, one can lessen the repetitive strain on the arms and hands.

== See also ==
- List of mechanical keyboards
- Keyboard layout
  - AZERTY
  - QWERTY
  - QWERTZ
- Keyboard mapping
- List of keyboard switches
