= Buckling spring =

Mechanical switch mechanism

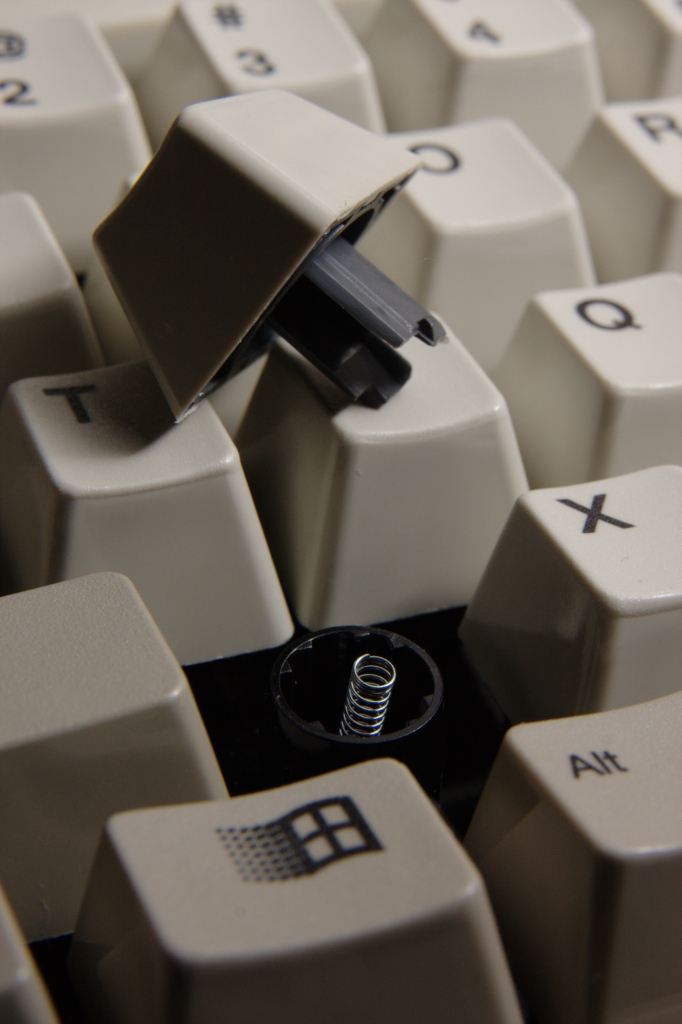
Unicomp Model M with removed z key. The exposed buckling spring is visible.

A buckling spring is a type of keyswitch mechanism that was popularized by IBM through its keyboards for the PC, PC/AT, 5250/3270 terminals, PS/2, and other systems. It was used by IBM's Model F keyboards (for instance the AT keyboard), and the more common Model M. It is described in U.S. patent 4,118,611 (Model F) and U.S. patent 4,528,431 (Model M), both now expired. According to the original patent: "A non-teasible, snap action, tactile feedback, key mechanism of extreme mechanical simplicity and high reliability is achieved."

== Operation ==
IBM M2 sound
The characteristic sound produced by the buckling-spring mechanisms of a Model M keyboard

The coil spring tensed between the keycap and a pivoting hammer buckles (i.e. kinks or collapses) at a certain point in its downward traverse, providing auditory and tactile feedback to the keyboard operator. Upon buckling, the hammer is pivoted forward by the spring and strikes an electrical contact which registers the key press. In a Model M, the electrical contact is a membrane sheet similar to that of a modern dome switch keyboard.

== Image gallery ==
Buckling spring on key press and release

Illustration from the original buckling spring U.S. patent 4,118,611, issued to IBM in 1978

A drawing included in the patent for the buckling spring mechanism

Graph of key force over key travel for a buckling spring key. Visible in graph position 1C the fast force drop when the spring buckles. U.S. patent 4,118,611, issued to IBM in 1978.

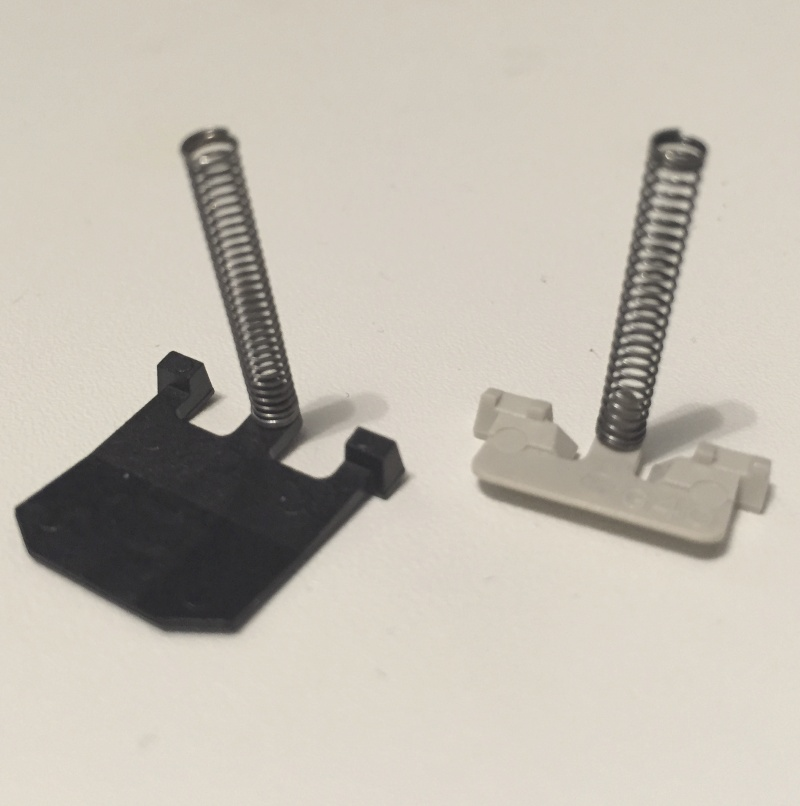
IBM Model F (left) and Model M (right) keyboard springs

== See also ==
- Euler's critical load
- List of mechanical keyboards
- Switch § Contact bounce
