= Glenn Henry (businessman) =

American computer industry executive

- Born: July 26, 1942 (age 84); Berkeley, California, U.S.
- Education: California State University, East Bay
- Occupations: Cofounder of Centaur Technology; Senior Vice President, Dell Computers

Glenn Henry (né Gaylord Glenn Henry; born July 26, 1942 Berkeley, California), is an American computer industry executive, cofounder of Centaur Technology, and inventor of computer technology at the advent and frontier era of the development of personal computers. He holds over 300 US patents.

== Education ==
In 1966, Henry earned a BS degree in mathematics from California State University, Hayward. The following year he earned a MS degree in mathematics.

== Career ==
Henry started his business career at IBM, where he worked for 21 years until 1988. He was the instigator, lead architect and development manager responsible for the IBM System/32, IBM System/38 (forerunner of the IBM AS/400), and IBM RT PC (forerunner of Power systems). He was appointed an IBM Fellow in 1985.

He went to work for Dell in 1988 as the company's first VP of R&D. In 1993 he was Dell's Senior Vice President in charge of products. While working there, he discovered that it was not possible to buy computer processors for less than $160 wholesale, thereby constraining the ultimate retail price of the resulting computer. In 1994, Henry left Dell and began working on a new Intel compatible design. Funding for this new processor was provided by IDT. His work lead to the foundation of Centaur Technology Inc. Centaur's first processor came to market in 1997. The company was subsequently bought by VIA Technologies in 1999.

Henry was the President of Centaur Technology until his partial retirement in 2019 (he still works part-time remotely). In addition to his management duties, he wrote microcode for the company's Intel compatible processors, and he designed hardware for several co-processors.

== Honors ==
In 1985, Henry was named an IBM Fellow. In 2016, Henry was named a "Distinguished Alumni" of California State University. In 2017, the Computer History Museum added Henry's oral history to their "key pioneers and contributors" history collection.
