= IBM System/32 =

IBM midrange computer (1975–1984)

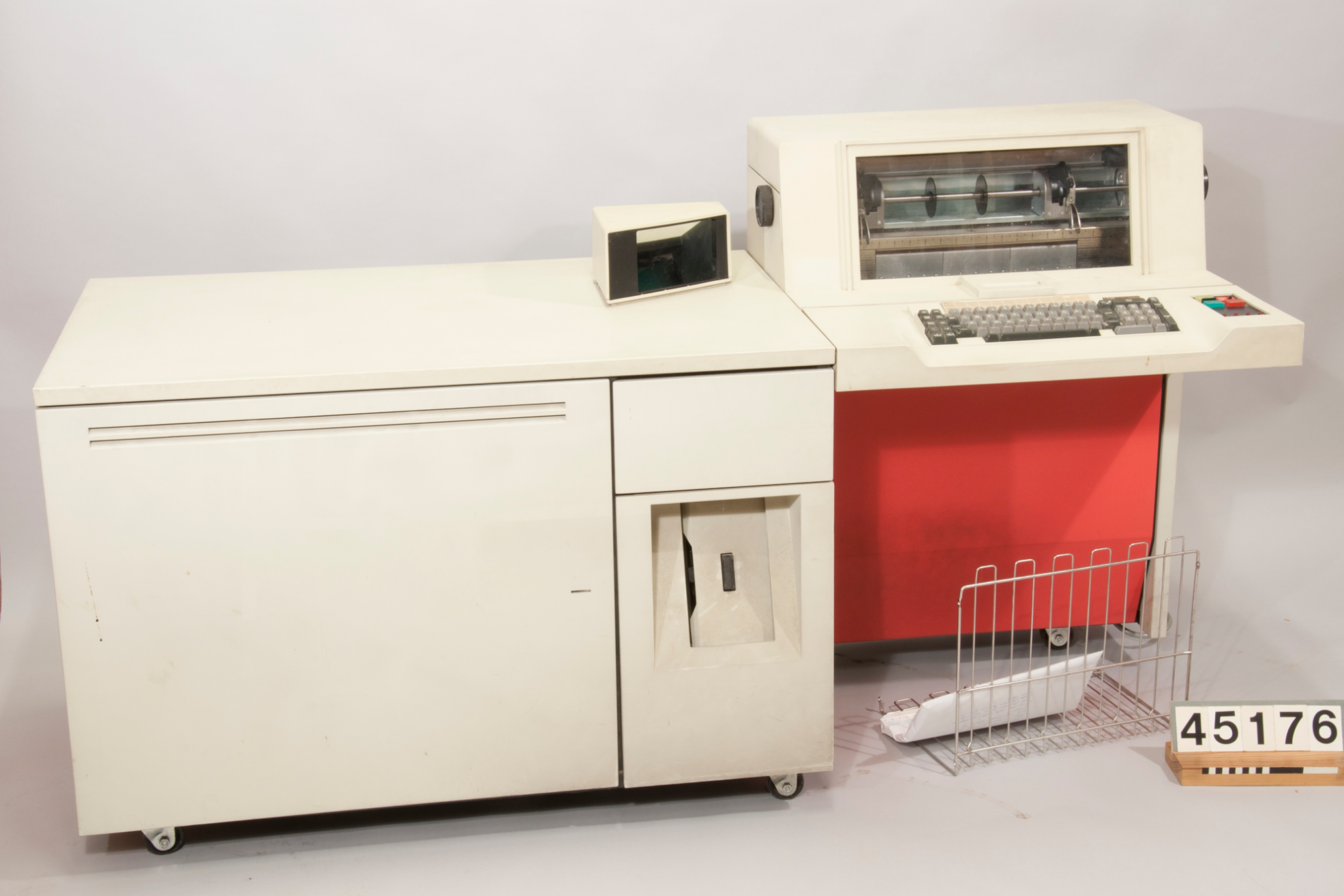
- IBM System/32
- Manufacturer: International Business Machines Corporation (IBM)
- Product family: System/32
- Released: January 7, 1975; 51 years ago
- Introductory price: approx $1,000 per month
- Discontinued: October 17, 1984
- Operating system: System Control Program (SCP)
- CPU: Control Storage Processor (CSP)
- Predecessor: IBM System/3
- Successor: IBM System/34
- Website: Official website IBM Archives

The IBM System/32 (IBM 5320) introduced in January 1975 was a midrange computer with built-in display screen, disk drives, printer, and database report software. It was used primarily by small to midsize businesses for accounting applications. RPG II was the primary programming language for the machine.

== Overview ==
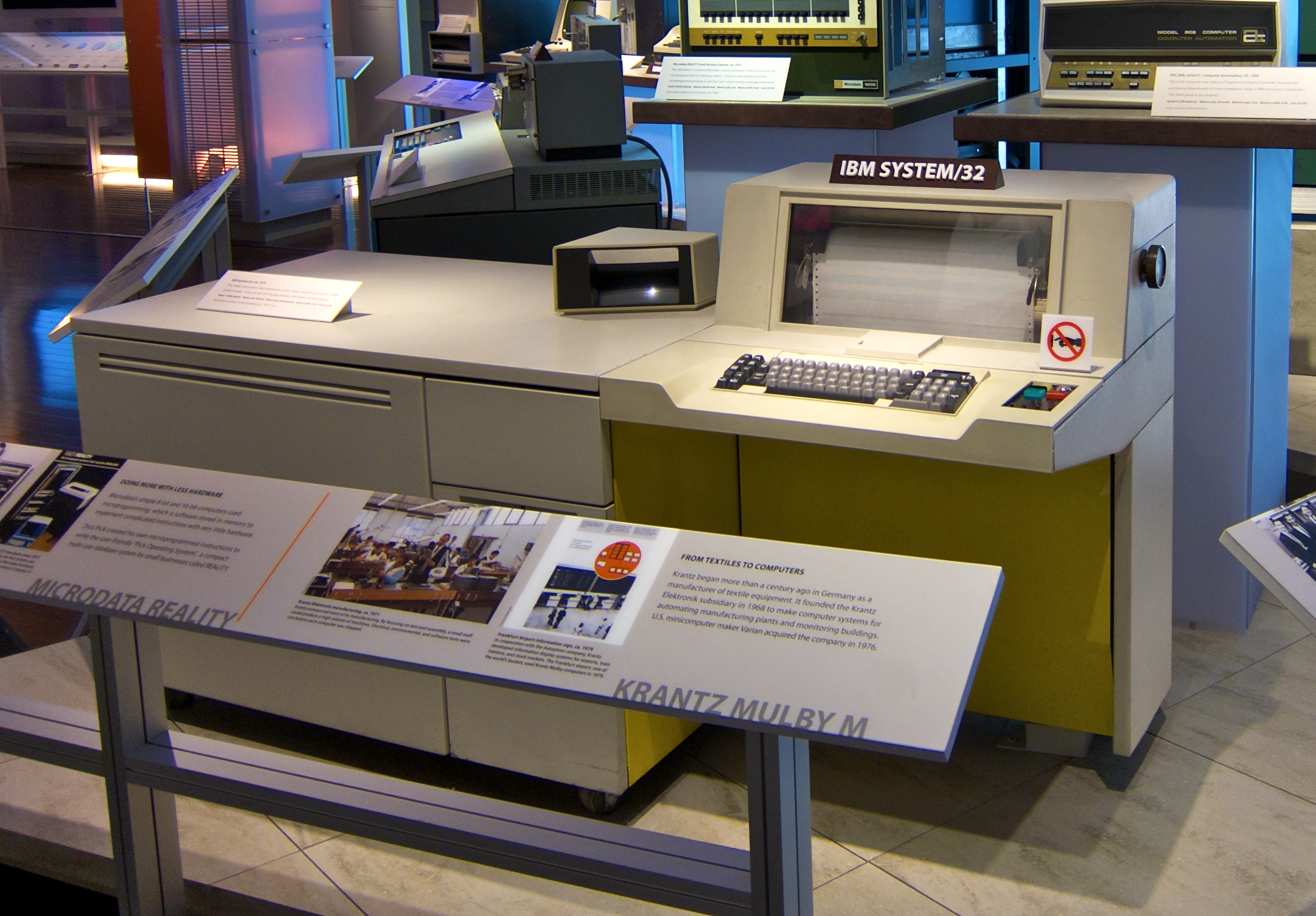
IBM System/32 in Computer History Museum

The 16-bit single-user System/32, also known as the IBM 5320, was introduced in 1975, and it was the successor to the IBM System/3 model 6 in the IBM midrange computer line. IBM described it as "the first system to incorporate hardware and comprehensive application software." The New York Times described the 32 as "a compact computer for first‐time users with little or no computer programming experience." Within 40 months, "the System/32 had surpassed the IBM System/3 as the most installed IBM computer."

The computer looked like a large office desk with a very small six-line by forty-character display. Having the appearance of a computerized desk, the System/32 was nicknamed the "Bionic Desk" after The Six Million Dollar Man (bionic man), a popular U.S. TV program when the computer was introduced in 1975. The 32 had a built-in line printer, that directly faced the operator when seated, and could print reports, memos, billing statements, address labels, etc.

It had been introduced January 7, 1975 and was withdrawn from marketing on October 17, 1984. Migration to the IBM System/34 was generally simple because source code was compatible and programs just needed recompilation.

== Processor ==
The System/32 featured a 16-bit processor with a 200ns cycle time known as the Control Storage Processor (CSP). Whereas the System/3 used a hardwired processor, the System/32 implemented the System/3 instruction set in microcode. The System/32 processor utilized a vertical microcode format, with each microinstruction occupying 16 bits of control storage. There were 19 different microinstruction opcodes, however certain microinstructions could carry out different operations depending on which bits were set in the rest of the microinstruction, meaning that there were about 70 distinct operations available in total. An optional set of Scientific Macroinstructions was also available, which were used to support a Fortran compiler by implementing support for floating point arithmetic in microcode. Some IBM engineers, including Glenn Henry and Frank Soltis, have retrospectively described the System/32's microcode as resembling a RISC instruction set.

The System/3 emulation performed poorly, which led IBM to implement performance critical parts of the SCP operating system directly in microcode. The later System/34 and System/36 systems addressed this problem by using two different processors - the System/32 CSP architecture was used exclusively for operating system, I/O control and floating point code, whereas user code ran on the Main Storage Processor (MSP) which implemented the System/3 instruction set directly in hardware without microcode. The use of microcode to implement instruction set emulation as well as performance-critical operating system components had some influence on the design of the microcode layers in the later System/38.

== Memory/storage ==
It had 16, 24, or 32 kilobytes of main memory, and 4 or 8 kilobytes of control storage. The larger control store was an optional extra, and was needed to support the scientific instruction set.

A single hard drive was available in one of three sizes:

- 5 MB
- 9 MB
- 13 MB

The system included an eight-inch floppy drive that could also read floppies from the IBM 3740 family.

Only one side of the 77-track floppy diskette was used. Each track held 26 128-byte sectors. An extended format was offered by IBM, and it permitted 512 bytes per sector. Even so, that came to an 8-inch floppy holding less than one third of a megabyte.

== System/32 operator ==
When keying input data, the operator would be viewing the character display, which was also common to the then current IBM 3740 family of data entry to floppy disk media.

A computer specialist was not required for the operation of System/32.

== System software ==
Some terms associated with the System/32's software include:

- SCP (System Control Program) the operating system of the System/32.
- SEU (Source Entry Utility, the programming editor),
- DFU (Data File Utility, a query and report generator),
- OCL (Operations Control Language, the command-line language), and
- #LIBRARY (the directory or disk partition in which executable code was stored).

== See also ==
- IBM System/3
- IBM System/34
- IBM System/36
- IBM System/38
