= System/34 BASIC =

BASIC interpreter

IBM System/3 BASIC was an interpreter for the BASIC programming language for the IBM System/34 midrange computer.

System/34 BASIC was first offered in 1978, and as such, contained many of the trappings that a BASIC program would have encountered in the time period of the TRS-80, or many other offerings of the 1970s and early 1980s. As such, S/34 BASIC uses conventions that are no longer standard in modern BASICs, such as line numbers, and does not support newer features such as WHILE/WEND, DO/ENDDO, WITH/END WITH, procedures, properties, and so forth.

== BASIC conventions ==
BASIC statements are expected to be entered in capital letters, and while the operator can press Cmd2 to use lowercase, the BASIC interpreter will convert non-comment keywords into uppercase.

So that BASIC could be useful in a midrange computing environment, IBM added extensions to the language that were specific to the hardware and software conventions of the IBM System/34 Family, such as the WORKSTN file, support for indexed, direct, and sequential disk files, the ability to open and close multiple printer files, and LOAD/SAVE from libraries on the fixed disk.

== BASIC statements ==
These core BASIC statements, functions, and commands were used:

  DATA
  DIM
  END
  FOR...NEXT
  GOSUB...RETURN
  GOTO
  IF...THEN
  INPUT
  LET
  ON...GOTO
  PRINT
  PRINT USING
  READ
  REM
  STOP
   
  ASC()
  RND()
  SIN()
  COS()
  TAN()
  TAB()
  SQRT()
  LOG()
  
  LIST

More advanced IBM-supplied statements included:

  ON ERROR       Allows error trapping
  OPTION         Permits program-wide properties such as Base 1 or Base 0 array indexing, long or short precision, etc.
  OPEN           Allows a file or device (formatted workstation, printer) to be opened
  CLOSE          Closes a file or device
  WRITE          Outputs to a file or device
  REWRITE        Changes a record or display format
  APPEND         Adds to a file
  DELETE         Deletes a record from a file
  IMAGE          Defines the format of a record using COBOL-like syntax
  FORM           Defines the format of a record using RPG-like syntax
  DEF FN..FNEND  Defines a function
  CHAIN          Loads and passes control to another BASIC program
  
  PRINT #255:          Prints to the (default) printer file
  PRINT NEWPAGE        Clears the screen
  PRINT #255: NEWPAGE  Advances to the next page on the printer file
  
  AIDX()         Refers to the ascending index of an array, which is an array of relative sorted pointers to array elements
  DIDX()         Same as AIDX but uses a descending index
  SRCH()         Used to find a value in an array by retrieving the match pointer         
  SRCH$()        Used to find a string value in a string array by retrieving the match pointer

  RENUMBER       A command used to renumber the lines within a program
  LOAD           A command used to load a program from a library on the fixed disk
  SAVE           A command used to save a program to a library on the fixed disk
  OFF            A command used to exit the interactive BASIC session
  LISTP          A command used to list the current program to the printer

ON ERROR is an error-trapping statement that allows BASIC to suspend an error that might otherwise stop a BASIC program from running and perform an error-handling routine instead. Variants include suffixing OFLOW, ZDIV, and other error types to a statement and immediately trap these errors.

OPTION allows the BASIC program to meet special criteria. Sometimes BASIC did not have very much user space (since all S/34 programs are limited to 64K) and the area called "code space" which contains the current user program must reside within the user space. Therefore, users could choose OPTION LPREC which causes BASIC to compute with double-precision (long) numerics, or OPTION SPREC which provides more space and single-precision (short) numerics. Some programmers prefer matrix mathematics where the lowest-numbered index is 0, others prefer 1. OPTION BASE 0 and OPTION BASE 1 accomplish this. There are other uses for OPTION.

RPG II programs on the S/34 could not call each other, but BASIC programs could, using the CHAIN statement. CHAIN passes control from the current BASIC module to the named module, bearing a list of arguments which can become variables in the new module when it is loaded.

DEF FN allows the definition of a user function in BASIC which can be named and referred in the program. FNEND is placed after the last statement in a function.

There are four ways to format BASIC input and output. First, unformatted; just PRINT and INPUT to your heart's content. Second, with PRINT USING, which in S/34 BASIC can incorporate a constant, a string variable, a line number, or a label. Third, with PRINT FIELDS and INPUT FIELDS, which place 5250-type display fields on the CRT in immediate mode. Fourth, by using a workstation file (opened with OPEN #x: "WS,NAME=" and so forth) and performing various combinations of WRITE and READ to that workstation file, using SDA-generated screen formats similar to those in other S/34 applications. WRITE and READ, as well as PRINT USING and INPUT USING, can direct BASIC to a line number or a label that contains the keyword "IMAGE:".

An IMAGE statement contains decimals, commas, dollar signs, dashes, and pound signs ("#") in representation of the substituted numeric or alphameric values.

3540 IMAGE: ###-##-####  #############################  $#,###,###.##

A FORM statement denotes the size of the variables to be read or written. To save a numeric value of .00 to 99,999.99, use this notation:

2959 FORM N 7.2

A label is a tag on a line as follows:

260 BEGIN_CALCULATIONS::
270 FOR X = 1 TO 12
280 Y = Y + X*1.08
290 NEXT X

If desired, the statement GOSUB BEGIN_CALCULATIONS can be used instead of GOSUB 260.

OPEN, CLOSE, WRITE, REWRITE, DELETE, and APPEND are already familiar to COBOL programmers and describe the actions taken to access S/34 disk files using BASIC. It isn't possible to access every single type of S/34 file because these include system files, libraries, and folders, but every user-created S/34 file with a fixed record length (only FORTRAN programs can use variable record lengths) will suffice. Disk files can be opened sequentially, by index, or relatively (by record number). If a file is delete-capable, records can be deleted using the DELETE statement. To add a record, use WRITE (with APPEND specified in the OPEN statement) and to update use REWRITE.

== Printing ==
In S/34 BASIC, to print to the printer, a device file must be used. A default printer file called #255 always exists when BASIC is started. It has a printer name of BASIC255 and opens the device that is the default printer for the terminal that begins a BASIC session. If desired, it is possible to create a different printer file numbered between 1 and 254. Use OPEN #x: PRINTER,NAME= and so forth to do this, specifying columns or device ID or other parameters as needed. The PAGEOFLOW keyword can be used to trap the page overflow condition for the printer.

== Array ==
Some versions of BASIC allow the programmer to sort an array. S/34 BASIC doesn't provide a function for this, but it does provide an interesting remedy. The programmer can define an array with the same number of elements as the target array and use AIDX or DIDX to create an ascending or descending index. Each element of the new array will contain a number representing the ordinal sorted position of the target array, so if AMERICA is the sixth element of array A$ but first in alphabetical order, then setting A() = AIDX(A$) would cause A(1) to contain the value 6.

To save a BASIC program to a library member, SAVE is used, and REPLACE when an update is made.

SAVE PROG1,PGMRLIB causes the current module to be saved as a subroutine member (type R) named PROG1 in a user library named PGMRLIB.

Note that System/34 files are not part of libraries. If a disk file is named FNF001, then an OPEN statement like this one can work:

OPEN #3:"NAME=FNF001,SEQUENTIAL",INPUT

It doesn't matter which library is used to access file FNF001.

RENUMBER is the S/34 BASIC command used to renumber statements. All internal references to statement numbers are immediately recalculated.

System/34 BASIC has a very dangerous command called FREE. Typing FREE followed by a filename deletes that file without a trace. It will work for every user file, unless there is a conflict of security or an in-use condition that blocks it.

System/34 BASIC has another dangerous command called LOCK. The LOCK command will make the current program source code inaccessible and it is not reversible. Always save an unlocked copy before using LOCK.

== Incompatibility Between S/34 and S/36 ==
In 1983, IBM announced the System/36 family of midrange computers.

System/34 BASIC and System/36 BASIC are very similar; however, machine code incompatibility makes it impossible to port a subroutine member BASIC program between these systems.
