= IBM System/34 =

IBM midrange computer (1977–1985)

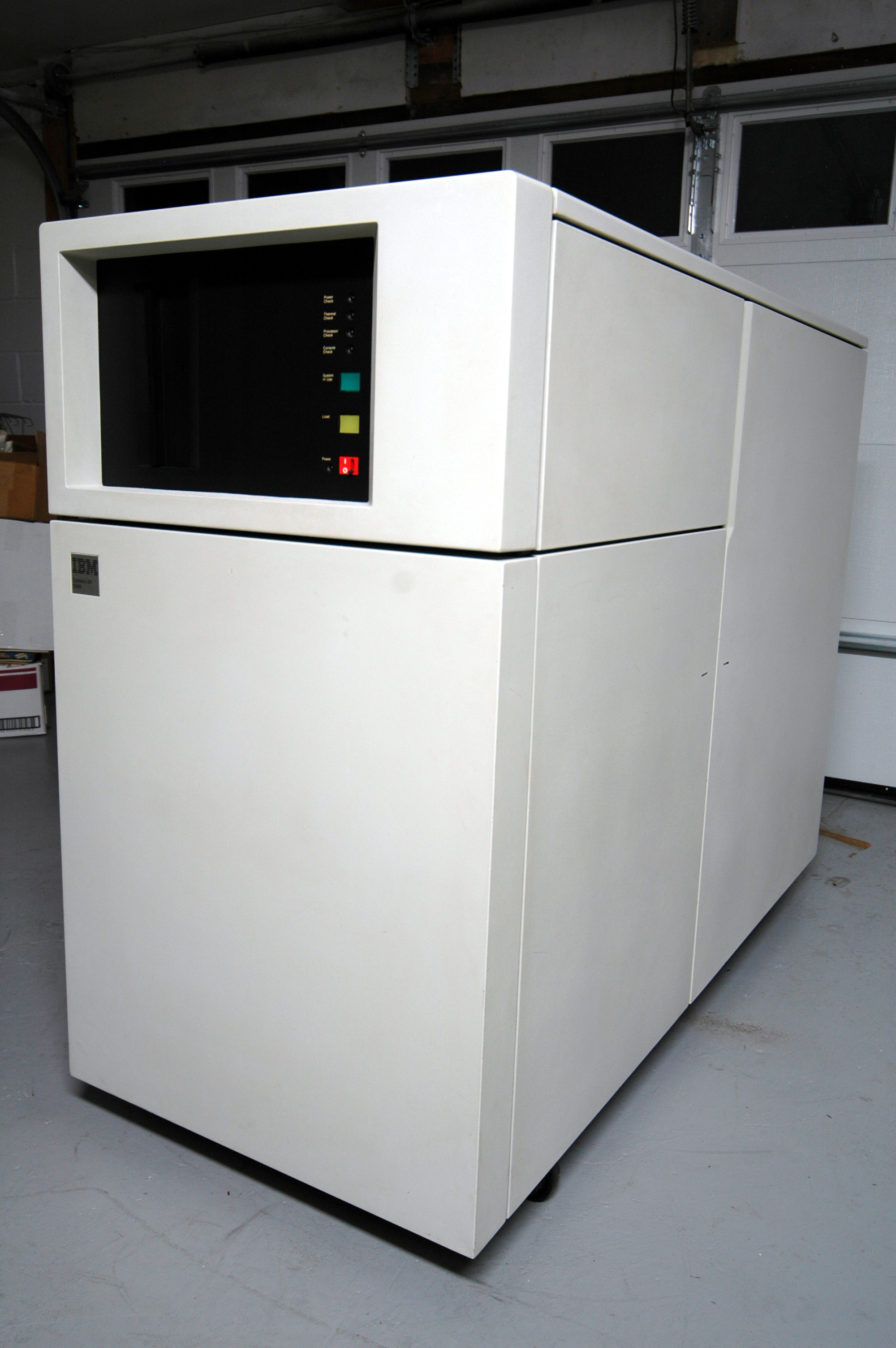
- IBM System/34 type 5340
- Also known as: S/34
- Manufacturer: International Business Machines Corporation (IBM)
- Product family: System/34
- Released: April 1977; 48 years ago
- Discontinued: February 1985
- Operating system: System Support Program
- CPU: MSP and CSP
- Memory: 48K – 256K
- Dimensions: 1220x660x1570mm
- Predecessor: IBM System/32
- Successor: IBM System/36, IBM System/38
- Related: IBM 5520
- Website: "IBM Archives: System/34". Archived from the original on 2018-10-05.

The IBM System/34 was an IBM midrange computer introduced in 1977. It was withdrawn from marketing in February 1985. It was a multi-user, multi-tasking successor to the single-user System/32. It included two processors, one based on the System/32 and the second based on the System/3. Like the System/32 and the System/3, the System/34 was primarily programmed in the RPG II language.

== Hardware ==
The 5340 System Unit contained the processing unit, the disk storage and the diskette drive. It had several access doors on both sides. Inside, were swing-out assemblies where the circuit boards and memory cards were mounted. It weighed 700 lb (320 kg) and used 220V power. The IBM 5250 series of terminals were the primary interface to the System/34.

=== Processors ===
S/34s had two processors, the Control Storage Processor (CSP), and the Main Storage Processor (MSP). The MSP was the workhorse, based on System/3 architecture; it performed the instructions in the computer programs. The CSP was the governor, a different processor with different RISC-like instruction set, based on System/32 architecture; it performed system functions in the background. The CSP also executed the optional Scientific Macroinstructions, which were a set of emulated floating point operations used by the System/34 Fortran compiler and optionally in assembly code. The clock speed of the CPUs inside a System/34 was fixed at 1 MHz for the MSP and 4 MHz for the CSP. Special utility programs were able to make direct calls to the CSP to perform certain functions; these are usually system programs like $CNFIG which was used to configure the computer system.

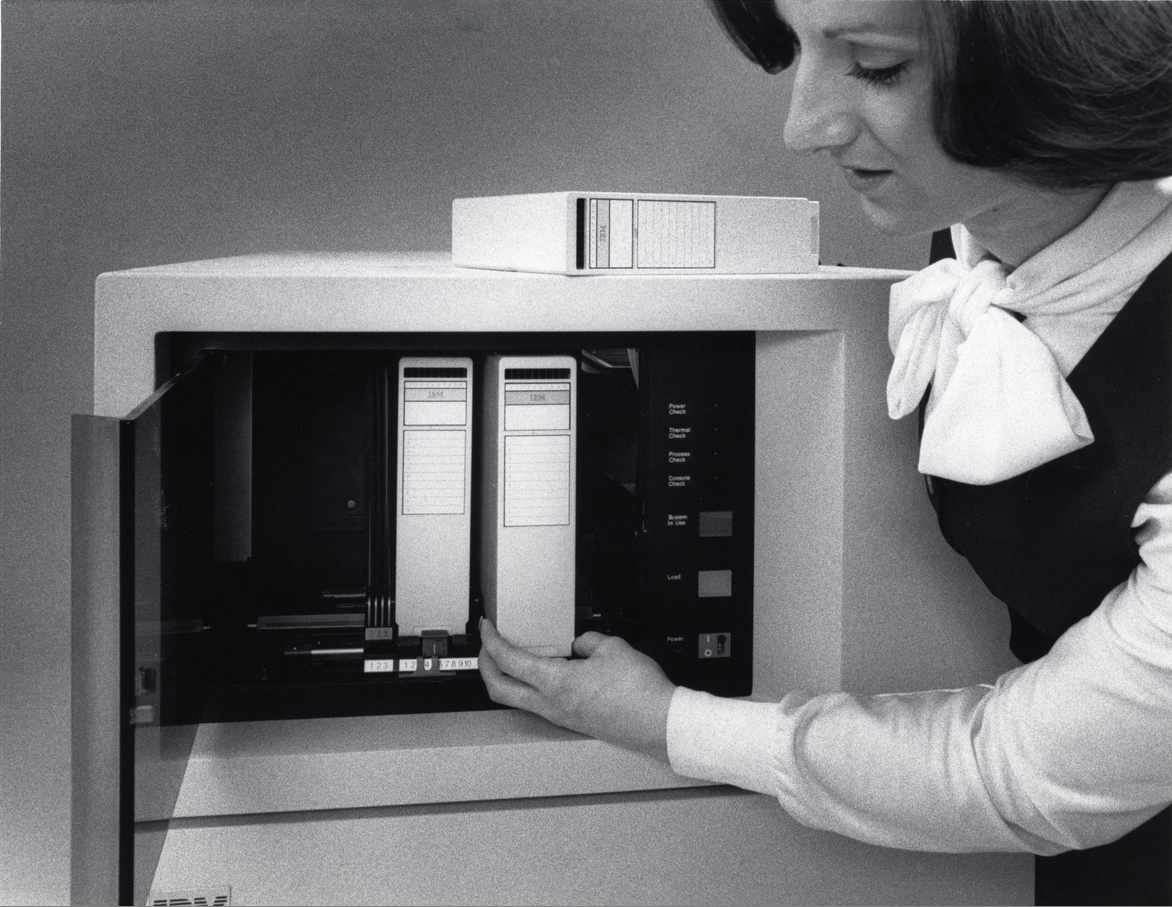
Picture of a System/34 showing the diskette magazine drive

=== Memory and storage ===
The smallest S/34 had 48K of RAM and an 8.6 MB hard drive. The largest configured S/34 could support 256K of RAM and 256MB of disk space. S/34 hard drives contained a feature called "the extra cylinder," so that bad spots on the drive were detected and dynamically mapped out to good spots on the extra cylinder. Disk space on the System/34 was organized by blocks of 2560 bytes.

The System/34 supported memory paging, referring to as swapping. The System/34 could either swap out entire programs, or individual segments of a program in order to free up memory for other programs to run.

One of the machine's most distinctive features was an off-line storage mechanism that utilized "magazines"—boxes of 8-inch floppies that the machine could load and eject in a nonsequential fashion.

== Software ==
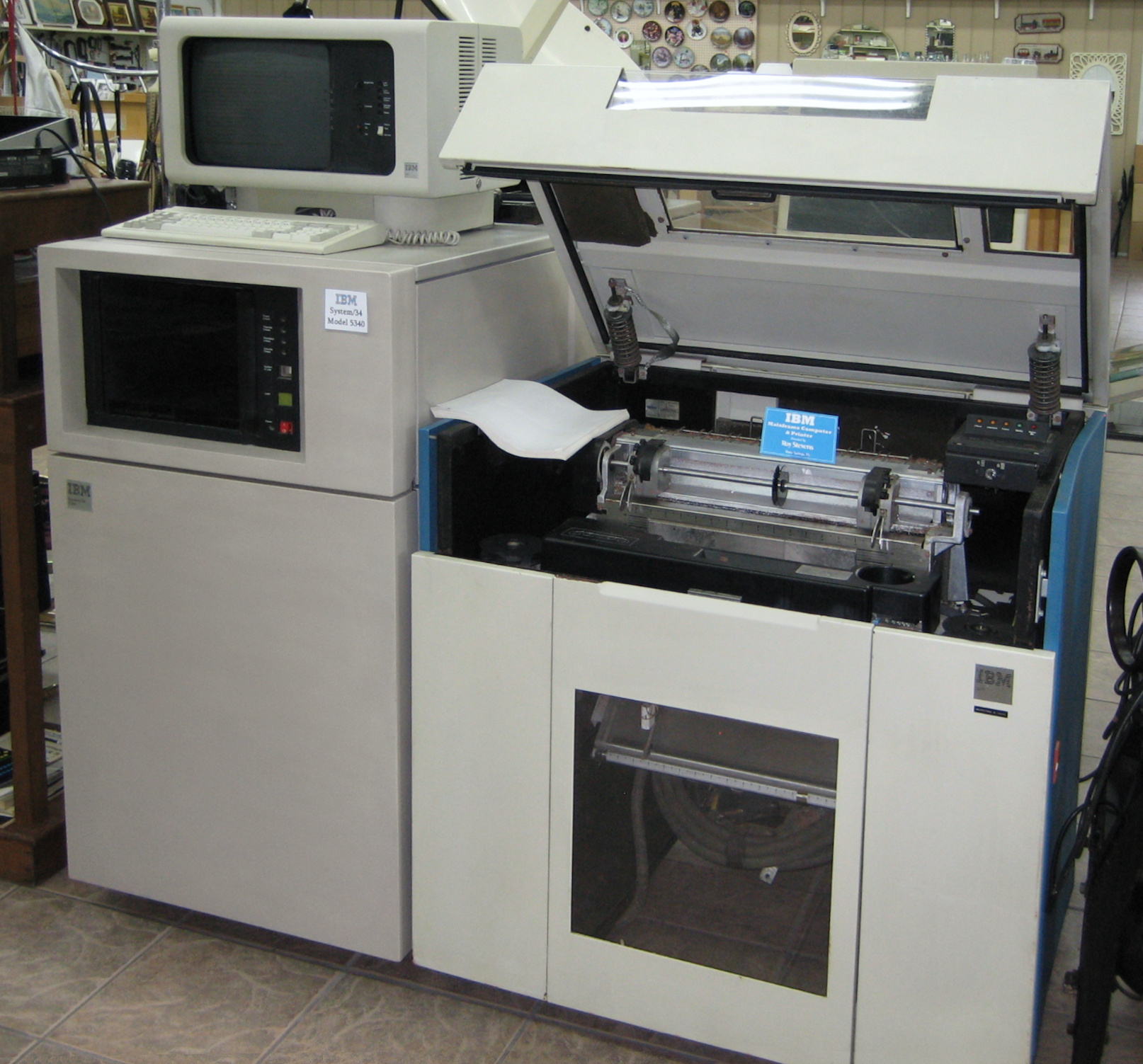
IBM System/34 with 5251 terminal (on top) and 5211 printer (right, with top opened)

=== Operating System ===
The System Support Program (SSP) was the only operating system of the S/34. It contained support for multiprogramming, multiple processors, 36 devices, job queues, printer queues, security, indexed file support. Fully installed, it was about 5 MB. The Operational Control Language (OCL) was the control language of SSP.

=== Programming ===
The System/34's initial programming languages were limited to RPG II and Basic Assembler when introduced in 1977. FORTRAN was fully available six months after the 34's introduction, and COBOL was available as a PRPQ. BASIC was introduced later.

== Successor systems ==
The IBM System/38 was intended to be the successor of the System/34 and the earlier System/3x systems. However, due to the delays in the development of the System/38 and the high cost of the hardware once complete, IBM developed the simpler and cheaper System/36 platform which was more widely adopted than the System/38. The System/36 was an evolution of the System/34 design, but the two machines were not object-code compatible. Instead, the System/36 offered source code compatibility, allowing System/34 applications to be recompiled on a System/36 with little to no changes. Some System/34 hardware was incompatible with the System/36.

A third-party product from California Software Products, Inc. named BABY/34 allowed System/34 applications to be ported to IBM PC compatible hardware running MS-DOS.

IBM midrange computers
Preceded by IBM System/3	IBM System/34; 1977–1985	Succeeded by IBM System/36
Preceded by IBM System/32	IBM System/34; 1977–1985	Succeeded by IBM System/36
