= Model F keyboard =

Series of computer keyboards

The Model F was a series of computer keyboards produced mainly from 1981–1985 and in reduced volume until 1994 by IBM and later Lexmark. Its mechanical-key design consisted of a buckling spring over a capacitive PCB, similar to the later Model M keyboard that used a membrane in place of the PCB.

The Model F first appeared with the IBM System/23 Datamaster all-in-one computer. It is best known as part of the IBM Personal Computer in 1981 with some keycap label differences, and its subsequent release with the IBM Personal Computer/AT, where it was reconfigured with the AT protocol and some layout revisions. After the introduction of the Model M keyboard, production was ramped down and eventually limited to replacement units for existing installations.

The capacitive design is widely considered superior to that of the later membrane design used on the Model M. It has a lighter actuation force of about 600 mN, a crisper feel, and louder feedback. It also has a higher MTBF of over 100 million keypresses, and full n-key rollover. These advantages were sacrificed in the Model M in order to lower manufacturing costs.

IBM Model F (1984)
The sound of an IBM Model F from 1984.

== Variations ==
Many IBM keyboards were based on Model F technology, featuring different keycaps, layouts and connections:

| Name | PN | Description | Image |
|---|---|---|---|
| Model F 'XT' | 1801449 | Released in 1981 with the original IBM PC. Uses an XT connector. | 83-key PC/XT keyboard |
| Model F 'AT' | 6450200 (US version) | Released in 1984 with the IBM PC AT. Uses an AT connector. | 84-key PC/AT keyboard |
| Model F '122-key terminal keyboard' | 611034x | Terminal keyboard originally released for the IBM PC 3270. Later used with some IBM terminal equipment. Uses an IBM proprietary terminal connector. | 122-key keyboard |
| Model F '104-key terminal keyboard' | 1387033 | Terminal keyboard released for the IBM 5085 and IBM 3290. | |
| Model F '3178 blue switch 87-key' | 6019284 | 87-key keyboard released for the IBM 3178, so named because of the blue toggle switch on the top half. | |
| Model F '4704 62-key' | 6019284 | 62-key keyboard released for the IBM 4704 | |
| Model F '4704 107-key' | 6020218 | 107-key keyboard released for the IBM 4704 | |
| Model F '4704 50-key' | 6019273 | 50-key keypad released for the IBM 4704 | |
| Model F 'Displaywriter' | ? | Keyboard released for the IBM Displaywriter System, these Model F keyboards featured fully white keys. | |

== Enthusiasts and modern re-creation ==
From April 1986 IBM shipped the PC AT and PC XT with the Model M keyboard. The enthusiast community around the Model M also prizes Model Fs and restores them for use with modern systems, though fewer are still in use due to lower production volume and a layout that is somewhat awkward and limited by modern standards.

Since 2016 a project has been underway to manufacture for sale keyboards with a faithful re-creation of the model F mechanism, completely independently of IBM. The New Model F has two variants which both resemble the 4704, but with default layouts tweaked in the direction of a Model M (notably using an inverted-T arrow-key cluster rather than the old-fashioned cross layout of the original Model Fs). This project has attracted over 25,000 subscribers and began shipping in December 2019.

== Design ==
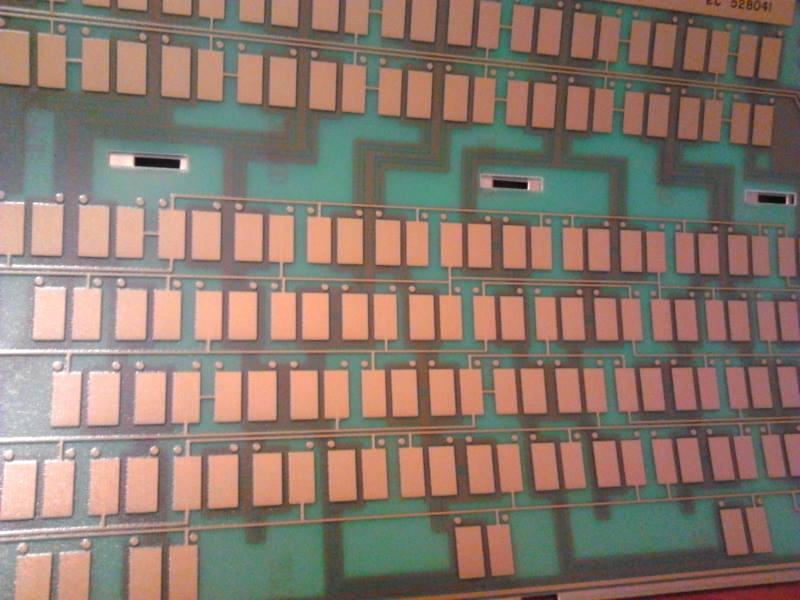
Model F capacitive pads from an opened assembly

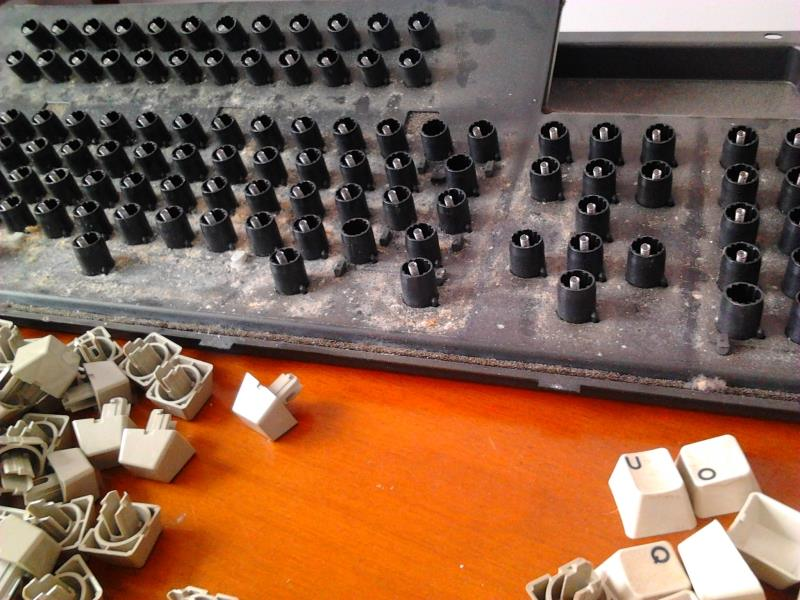
Corrosion occurring on a Model F 122 terminal keyboard along with dust

The Model F's key-switch design was more durable than IBM's previous beam-spring mechanism, which was prone to failure from debris and was more complex to manufacture and service. The spring assembly consisted of a top metal plate with cut holes where the plastic spring barrels reside; a bottom sheet of metal then holds the assembly together and compresses the contact sheet with a foam spacer. Earlier Model F keyboards cannot have their space bars removed without disassembling the internal assembly; this also causes a slightly different feel response from the space bar specifically: some enthusiasts modify the tension of the stabilizer on these early Model F keyboards to provide a more satisfactory response.

The top metal plates in Model F keyboards are prone to corrosion and the internal foam can also rot from age, which often requires cleaning and a coating to prevent further corrosion. All Model F internal assemblies are held together with metal tabs, unlike the Model M which uses melted plastic rivets requiring more rivets to be melted on or modified with bolts.

A characteristic feature of the Model F is a plastic top shell painted with a cream paint to create a rough texture. The later Model M keyboards used injection plastic rather than paint to achieve this texture. The plastic used in the Model F is quite brittle and prone to hairline cracks, and the paint can wear off from excessive use.

== Comparison with Model M ==
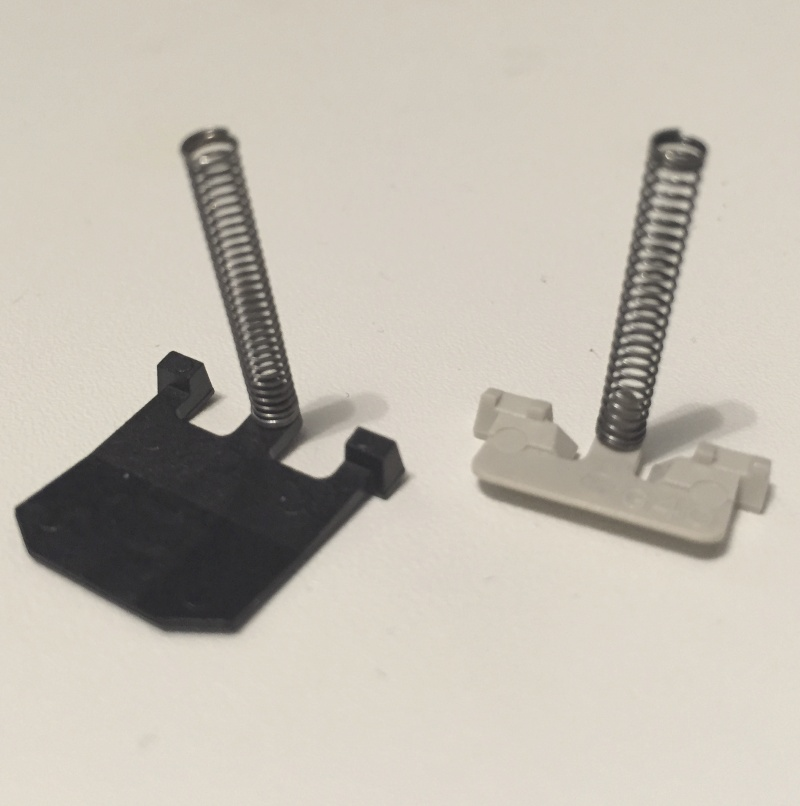
A comparison between a Model F spring (left) and a Model M spring (right); the Model M uses a spring with fewer windings and smaller plate for the plastic membrane underneath.

Although the Model F and Model M are both based on buckling-spring technology, there are considerable differences between them:

| | Model F | Model M |
|---|---|---|
| External chassis | Painted plastic (zinc metal in the 4704 series) and steel metal back panel (plastic in the F AT and zinc metal in the 4704 series) | Molded (unpainted) plastic, plastic back panel |
| Internal stabilizer | Only in early models | |
| Buckling spring implementation | Capacitive plate | Plastic membrane |
| Key rollover | Unlimited | 2-key rollover |
| Assembly method | Reusable metal tabs | Single-use plastic rivets |
| Spring barrels | Individually inserted in a metal plane | Single plastic mold with predefined barrels |

== See also ==
- Model M keyboard
- IBM PC keyboard
- IBM Displaywriter System
- IBM System/23
- List of mechanical keyboards
