= Integrated Language Environment =

The Integrated Language Environment (ILE) is a programming model developed by IBM for their AS/400 line of computers and remains an important part of the IBM i programming environment.

== Languages ==
IBM provides ILE compilers for C, C++, RPG, COBOL and CL. For RPG, COBOL and CL, there are both OPM compilers (still sometimes used for legacy applications) and the new ILE compilers. Likewise, as well as ILE C, there was an earlier EPM-based C/400, although that has been discontinued. Pascal and FORTRAN compilers were made available for EPM, but ILE compilers for those languages have never been released; likewise, BASIC and PL/1 compilers were available for OPM, but ILE compilers have never been released for those languages either.

== History ==
On February 16, 1993 IBM announced that V2R3 of OS/400 would include major changes to its programming language support – the introduction of ILE. It provided a common interface among the disparate programming languages available to the AS/400 computer platform. ILE was an improvement on the two existing programming models available on OS/400 – the Original Program Model (OPM), which was used for traditional business programming languages such as RPG and COBOL; and the Extended Programming Model (EPM), which was introduced for use by C and Pascal. OS/400 (now IBM i) continues to support OPM and EPM to run legacy applications, but new development is encouraged to be in ILE (or PASE, the Portable Applications System Environment, which provides partial binary compatibility with AIX).
