= IBM Future Systems project =

IBM research project in the 1970s for new computer designs

The Future Systems project (FS) was a research and development project undertaken in IBM in the early 1970s to develop a revolutionary line of computer products, including new software models which would simplify software development by exploiting modern powerful hardware. The new systems were intended to replace the System/370 in the market some time in the late 1970s.

There were two key components to FS. The first was the use of a single-level store that allows data stored on secondary storage like disk drives to be referred to within a program as if it was data stored in main memory; variables in the code could point to objects in storage and they would invisibly be loaded into memory, eliminating the need to write code for file handling. The second was to include instructions corresponding to the statements in high-level programming languages, allowing the system to directly run programs without the need for a compiler to convert from the language to machine code. One could, for instance, write a program in a text editor and the machine would be able to run that directly.

Combining the two concepts in a single system in a single step proved to be an impossible task. This concern was pointed out from the start by the engineers, but it was ignored by management and project leaders for many reasons. Officially started in the fall of 1971, by 1974 the project was moribund, and formally cancelled in February 1975. The single-level store was implemented in the System/38 in 1978 and moved to other systems in the lineup after that, but the concept of a machine that directly ran high-level languages has never appeared in an IBM product.

== History ==
=== 370 ===
The System/360 was announced in April 1964. Only six months later, IBM began a study project on what trends were taking place in the market and how these should be used in a series of machines that would replace the 360 in the future. One significant change was the introduction of useful integrated circuits (ICs), which would allow the many individual components of the 360 to be replaced with a smaller number of ICs. This would allow a more powerful machine to be built for the same price as existing models.

By the mid-1960s, the 360 had become a massive best-seller. This influenced the design of the new machines, as it led to demands that the machines have complete backward compatibility with the 360 series. When the machines were announced in 1970, now known as the System/370, they were essentially 360s using small-scale ICs for logic, much larger amounts of internal memory and other relatively minor changes. A few new instructions were added and others cleaned up, but the system was largely identical from the programmer's point of view.

The recession of 1969–1970 led to slowing sales in the 1970-71 time period and much smaller orders for the 370 compared to the rapid uptake of the 360 five years earlier. For the first time in decades, IBM's growth stalled. While some in the company began efforts to introduce useful improvements to the 370 as soon as possible to make them more attractive, others felt nothing short of a complete reimagining of the system would work in the long term.

=== Replacing the 370 ===
Two months before the announcement of the 370s, the company once again started considering changes in the market and how that would influence future designs. In 1965, Gordon Moore predicted that integrated circuits would see exponential growth in the number of circuits they supported, today known as Moore's Law. IBM's Jerrier A. Haddad wrote a memo on the topic, suggesting that the cost of logic and memory was going to zero faster than it could be measured.

An internal Corporate Technology Committee (CTC) study concluded a 30-fold reduction in the price of memory would take place in the next five years, and another 30 in the five after that. If IBM was going to maintain its sales figures, it was going to have to sell 30 times as much memory in five years, and 900 times as much five years later. Similarly, hard disk cost was expected to fall ten times in the next ten years. To maintain their traditional 15% year-over-year growth, by 1980 they would have to be selling 40 times as much disk space and 3600 times as much memory.

In terms of the computer itself, if one followed the progression from the 360 to the 370 and onto some hypothetical System/380, the new machines would be based on large-scale integration and would be dramatically reduced in complexity and cost. There was no way they could sell a line of those machines at current prices; if they tried, another company would introduce far less expensive systems. They could instead produce much more powerful machines at those prices, but their customers were already underutilizing their existing systems. To provide a reasonable argument to buy a new high-end machine, IBM had to come up with reasons for their customers to need this extra power.

Another strategic issue was that while the cost of computing was steadily going down, the costs of programming and operations, being made of personnel costs, were steadily going up. Therefore, the part of the customer's IT budget available for hardware vendors would be significantly reduced in the coming years, and with it the base for IBM revenue. It was imperative that IBM, by addressing the cost of application development and operations in its future products, reduce the total cost of IT to the customers and capture a larger portion of that cost.

=== AFS ===
In 1969, Bob O. Evans, president of the IBM System Development Division which developed their largest mainframes, asked Erich Bloch of the IBM Poughkeepsie Lab to consider how the company might use these much cheaper components to build machines that would still retain the company's profits. Bloch, in turn, asked Carl Conti to outline such systems. Having seen the term "future systems" being used, Evans referred to the group as Advanced Future Systems. The group met roughly biweekly.

Among the many developments initially studied under AFS, one concept stood out. At the time, the first systems with virtual memory (VM) were emerging, and the seminal Multics project had expanded on this concept as the basis for a single-level store. In this concept, all data in the system is treated as if it is in main memory, and if the data is physically located on secondary storage, the VM system automatically loads it into memory when a program calls for it. Instead of writing code to read and write data in files, the programmer simply told the operating system they would be using certain data, which then appeared as objects in the program's memory and could be manipulated like any other variable. The VM system would ensure that the data was synchronized with storage when needed.

This was seen as a particularly useful concept at the time, as the emergence of bubble memory suggested that future systems would not have separate core memory and disk drives, instead everything would be stored in a large amount of bubble memory. Physically, systems would be single-level stores, so the idea of having another layer for "files" which represented separate storage made no sense, and having pointers into a single large memory would not only mean one could simply refer to any data as it if were local, but also eliminate the need for separate application programming interfaces (APIs) for the same data depending on whether it was loaded or not.

=== HLS ===
Evans also asked John McPherson at IBM's Armonk headquarters to chair another group to consider how IBM would offer these new designs across their many divisions. A group of twelve participants spread across three divisions produced the "Higher Level System Report", or HLS, which was delivered on 25 February 1970. A key component of HLS was the idea that programming was more expensive than hardware. If a system could greatly reduce the cost of development, then that system could be sold for more money, as the overall cost of operation would still be lower than the competition.

The basic concept of the System/360 series was that a single instruction set architecture (ISA) would be defined that offered every possible instruction the assembly language programmer might desire. Whereas previous systems might be dedicated to scientific programming or currency calculations and had instructions for that sort of data, the 360 offered instructions for both of these and practically every other task. Individual machines were then designed that targeted particular workloads and ran those instructions directly in hardware and implemented the others in microcode. This meant any machine in the 360 family could run programs from any other, just faster or slower depending on the task. This proved enormously successful, as a customer could buy a low-end machine and always upgrade to a faster one in the future, knowing all their applications would continue to run.

Although the 360's instruction set was large, those instructions were still low-level, representing single operations that the central processing unit (CPU) would perform, like "add two numbers" or "compare this number to zero". Programming languages and their links to the operating system allowed users to type in programs using high-level concepts like "open file" or "add these arrays". The compilers would convert these higher-level abstractions into a series of machine code instructions.

For HLS, the instructions would instead represent those higher-level tasks directly. That is, there would be instructions in the machine code for "open file". If a program called this instruction, there was no need to convert this into lower-level code, the machine would do this internally in microcode or even a direct hardware implementation. This worked hand-in-hand with the single-level store; to implement HLS, every bit of data in the system was paired with a descriptor, a record that contained the type of the data, its location in memory, and its precision and size. As descriptors could point to arrays and record structures as well, this allowed the machine language to process these as atomic objects.

By representing these much higher-level objects directly in the system, user programs would be much smaller and simpler. For instance, to add two arrays of numbers held in files in traditional languages, one would generally open the two files, read one item from each, add them, and then store the value to a third file. In the HLS approach, one would simply open the files and call add. The underlying operating system would map these into memory, create descriptors showing them both to be arrays and then the add instruction would see they were arrays and add all the values together. Assigning that value into a newly created array would have the effect of writing it back to storage. A program that might take a page or so of code was now reduced to a few lines. Moreover, as this was the natural language of the machine, the command shell was itself programmable in the same way, there would be no need to "write a program" for a simple task like this, it could be entered as a command.

The report concluded:

The user and IBM should both gain substantially from the easier coding and debugging of concise programs. We expect to sharply reduce the cost of programming and the size of complex programs, as both program quality and programmer productivity are enhanced.

=== Compatible concerns ===
Until the end of the 1960s, IBM had been making most of its profit on hardware, bundling support software and services along with its systems to make them more attractive. Only hardware carried a price tag, but those prices included an allocation for software and services.

Other manufacturers had started to market compatible hardware, mainly peripherals such as tape and disk drives, at a price significantly lower than IBM, thus shrinking the possible base for recovering the cost of software and services. IBM responded by refusing to service machines with these third-party add-ons, which led almost immediately to sweeping anti-trust investigations and many subsequent legal remedies. In 1969, the company was forced to end its bundling arrangements and announced they would sell software products separately.

IBM employee Gene Amdahl saw an opportunity to sell compatible machines without software; the customer could purchase a machine from Amdahl and the operating system and other software from IBM. If IBM refused to sell it to them, they would be breaching their legal obligations. In early 1970, Amdahl quit IBM and announced his intention to introduce System/370 compatible machines that would be faster than IBM's high-end offerings but cost less to purchase and operate.

At first, IBM was unconcerned. They made most of their money on software and support, and that money would still be going to them. But to be sure, in early 1971 an internal IBM task force, Project Counterpoint, was formed to study the concept. They concluded that the compatible mainframe business was indeed viable and that the basis for charging for software and services as part of the hardware price would quickly vanish. These events created a desire within the company to find some solution that would once again force the customers to purchase everything from IBM but in a way that would not violate antitrust laws.

If IBM followed the suggestions of the HLS report, this would mean that other vendors would have to copy the microcode implementing the huge number of instructions. As this was software, those companies would be violating copyright. At this point, the AFS/HLS concepts gained new currency within the company.

=== Future Systems ===
In May–June 1971, an international task force convened in Armonk under John Opel, then a vice-president of IBM. Its assignment was to investigate the feasibility of a new line of computers which would take advantage of IBM's technological advantages in order to render obsolete all previous computers - compatible offerings but also IBM's own products. The task force concluded that the project was worth pursuing, but that the key to acceptance in the marketplace was an order-of-magnitude reduction in the costs of developing, operating and maintaining application software.

The major objectives of the FS project were consequently stated as follows:

- make obsolete all existing computing equipment, including IBM's, by fully exploiting the newest technologies,
- diminish greatly the costs and efforts involved in application development and operations,
- provide a technically sound basis for re-bundling as much as possible of IBM's offerings (hardware, software and services)

It was hoped that a new architecture making heavier use of hardware resources, the cost of which was going down, could significantly simplify software development and reduce costs for both IBM and customers.

== Technology ==
=== Data access ===
One design principle of FS was a "single-level store" which extended the idea of virtual memory (VM) to cover persistent data. In traditional designs, programs allocate memory to hold values that represent data. This data would normally disappear when the computer reused the memory for its next task. In order to have this data available in the future, additional code is needed to write it to permanent storage like a hard drive, and then read it back in the future. To ease these common operations, a number of database engines emerged in the 1960s that allowed programs to hand data to the engine which would then save it and retrieve it again on demand.

Another emerging technology at the time was the concept of virtual memory. In early systems, the amount of memory available to a program to allocate for data was limited by the amount of main memory in the system, which might vary based on such factors as it is moved from one machine to another, or if other programs were allocating memory of their own. Virtual memory systems addressed this problem by defining a maximum amount of memory available to all programs, typically some very large number, much more than the physical memory in the machine. In the case that a program asks to allocate memory that is not physically available, a block of main memory is written out to disk, and that space is used for the new allocation. If the program requests data from that offloaded ("paged" or "spooled") memory area, it is invisibly loaded back into main memory again.

A single-level store is essentially an expansion of virtual memory to all memory, internal or external. VM systems invisibly write memory to a disk, which is the same task as the file system, so there is no reason it cannot be used as the file system. Instead of programs allocating memory from "main memory" which is then perhaps sent to some other backing store by VM, all memory is immediately allocated by the VM. This means there is no need to save and load data, simply allocating it in memory will have that effect as the VM system writes it out. When the user logs back in, that data, and the programs that were running it as they are also in the same unified memory, are immediately available in the same state they were before. The entire concept of loading and saving is removed, programs, and entire systems, pick up where they were even after a machine restart.

This concept had been explored in the Multics system but proved to be very slow, but that was a side-effect of available hardware where the main memory was implemented in core with a far slower backing store in the form of a hard drive or drum. With the introduction of new forms of non-volatile memory, most notably bubble memory, that worked at speeds similar to core but had memory density similar to a hard disk, it appeared a single-level store would no longer have any performance downside.

Future Systems planned on making the single-level store the key concept in its new operating systems. Instead of having a separate database engine that programmers would call, there would simply be calls in the system's application programming interface (API) to retrieve memory. And those API calls would be based on particular hardware or microcode implementations, which would be available only on IBM systems, thereby achieving IBM's goal of tightly tying the hardware to the programs that ran on it.

=== Processor ===
Another principle was the use of very high-level complex instructions to be implemented in microcode. As an example, one of the instructions, CreateEncapsulatedModule, was a complete linkage editor. Other instructions were designed to support the internal data structures and operations of programming languages such as FORTRAN, COBOL, and PL/I. In effect, FS was designed to be the ultimate complex instruction set computer (CISC).

Another way of presenting the same concept was that the entire collection of functions previously implemented as hardware, operating system software, data base software and more would now be considered as making up one integrated system, with each and every elementary function implemented in one of many layers including circuitry, microcode, and conventional software. More than one layer of microcode and code were contemplated, sometimes referred to as picocode or millicode. Depending on the people one was talking to, the very notion of a "machine" therefore ranged between those functions which were implemented as circuitry (for the hardware specialists) to the complete set of functions offered to users, irrespective of their implementation (for the systems architects).

The overall design also called for a "universal controller" to handle primarily input-output operations outside of the main processor. That universal controller would have a very limited instruction set, restricted to those operations required for I/O, pioneering the concept of a reduced instruction set computer (RISC).

Meanwhile, John Cocke, one of the chief designers of early IBM computers, began a research project to design the first reduced instruction set computer (RISC). In the long run, the IBM 801 RISC architecture, which eventually evolved into IBM's POWER, PowerPC, and Power architectures, proved to be vastly cheaper to implement and capable of achieving much higher clock rate.

== Development ==
=== Project start ===
The FS project was officially started in September 1971, following the recommendations of a special task force assembled in the second quarter of 1971. In the course of time, several other research projects in various IBM locations merged into the FS project or became associated with it.

=== Project management ===
During its entire life, the FS project was conducted under tight security provisions. The project was broken down into many subprojects assigned to different teams. The documentation was similarly broken down into many pieces, and access to each document was subject to verification of the need-to-know by the project office. Documents were tracked and could be called back at any time.

An internal memo from John F. Sowa's noted The avowed aim of all this red tape is to prevent anyone from understanding the whole system; this goal has certainly been achieved.

As a consequence, most people working on the project had an extremely limited view of it, restricted to what they needed to know in order to produce their expected contribution. Some teams were even working on FS without knowing. This explains why, when asked to define FS, most people give a very partial answer, limited to the intersection of FS with their field of competence.

=== Planned product lines ===
Three implementations of the FS architecture were planned: the top-of-line model was being designed in Poughkeepsie, NY, where IBM's largest and fastest computers were built; the next model down was being designed in Endicott, NY, which had responsibility for the mid-range computers; the model below that was being designed in Böblingen, Germany, and the smallest model was being designed in Hursley, UK.

A continuous range of performance could be offered by varying the number of processors in a system at each of the four implementation levels.

In early 1973, overall project management and the teams responsible for the more "outside" layers common to all implementations were consolidated in the Mohansic ASDD laboratory (halfway between the Armonk/White Plains headquarters and Poughkeepsie).

=== Project end ===
The FS project was terminated in 1975. The reasons given for terminating the project depend on the person asked, each of whom puts forward the issues related to the domain with which they were familiar. In reality, the success of the project was dependent on a large number of breakthroughs in all areas from circuit design and manufacturing to marketing and maintenance. Although each single issue, taken in isolation, might have been resolved, the probability that they could all be resolved in time and in mutually compatible ways was practically zero.

One symptom was the poor performance of its largest implementation, but the project was also marred by protracted internal arguments about various technical aspects, including internal IBM debates about the merits of RISC vs. CISC designs. The complexity of the instruction set was another obstacle; it was considered "incomprehensible" by IBM's own engineers and there were strong indications that the system wide single-level store could not be backed up in part, foretelling the IBM AS/400's partitioning of the System/38's single-level store. Moreover, simulations showed that the execution of native FS instructions on the high-end machine was slower than the System/370 emulator on the same machine.

The FS project was finally terminated when IBM realized that customer acceptance would be much more limited than originally predicted because there was no reasonable application migration path for 360 architecture customers. In order to leave maximum freedom to design a truly revolutionary system, ease of application migration was not one of the primary design goals for the FS project, but was to be addressed by software migration aids taking the new architecture as a given. In the end, it appeared that the cost of migrating the mass of user investments in COBOL and assembly language based applications to FS was in many cases likely to be greater than the cost of acquiring a new system.

== Results ==
Although the FS project as a whole was terminated, a simplified version of the architecture for the smallest of the three machines continued to be developed in Rochester. It was finally released as the IBM System/38, which proved to be a good design for ease of programming, but it was woefully underpowered. The AS/400 inherited the same architecture, but with performance improvements. In both machines, the high-level instruction set generated by compilers is not interpreted, but translated into a lower-level machine instruction set and executed; the original lower-level instruction set was a CISC instruction set with some similarities to the System/360 instruction set. In later machines the lower-level instruction set was an extended version of the PowerPC instruction set, which evolved from John Cocke's IBM 801 RISC developments. The dedicated hardware platform was replaced in 2008 by the IBM Power Systems platform running the IBM i operating system.

Besides System/38 and the AS/400, which inherited much of the FS architecture, bits and pieces of Future Systems technology were incorporated in the following parts of IBM's product line:

- the IBM 3081 mainframe computer, which was essentially the top-of-the line machine designed in Poughkeepsie, using the System/370 emulator microcode
- the 3800 laser printer, and some machines that would lead to the IBM 3279 terminal and GDDM
- the IBM 3850 automatic magnetic tape library
- the IBM 8100 mid-range computer, which was based on a CPU called the Universal Controller, which had been intended for FS input/output processing
- network enhancements concerning VTAM and NCP
