= Programming Development Manager =

PDM (Programming development manager) was installed on most AS/400 systems as a part of the Applications Development ToolSet (ADT) and is still installed on most IBM i systems today. PDM is an environment that lets programmers and/or operators navigate three levels of the PDM:

Other "work with" commands for the designated levels of PDM are as follows:

- WRKLIBPDM (Library level)
- WRKOBJPDM (Object level)
- WRKMBRPDM (Member level)

PDM allows users to use shortcuts to perform repeated tasks. Using a specified options file (via F16), one can tailor these shortcuts to meet their needs. These shortcuts are limited to two alpha numeric characters, and are entered in the input field immediately preceding the library, object, or member. These shortcuts can be repeated en masse for all entries displayed within the relevant PDM screen via F13. This reduces the time it takes to complete common tasks like assigning authority, changing object ownership and several other functions. PDM also recalls last input parameters on a user basis, making repetition and recall easy.

PDM will allow a user to copy or rename libraries, objects and members. In addition, objects may be moved. It will also allow users to edit source members using the SEU function, edit display files via SDA or printer files via RLU. Some other quick commands include saving, restoring, displaying descriptions, deleting, changing, working with, running, changing text, finding a string, creating a program or service program, running a debugger, and comparing.

PDM also has a filter tool (currently F17) which allows a user to narrow their search parameters and limit results by object, object type, attributes, a size range, or by complete or partial text.

== Sources ==
- Fottral, Jerry. (2000). Mastering the AS/400: a practical, hands-on guide. 3rd ed. ISBN 1-58304-070-6
