= CTLD =

CTLD or cTLD can refer to

- C-type lectin-like domain
- Country code top-level domain
- A configuration object in the IBM i Library standing for "controller description".
