= Frank Soltis =

American computer scientist

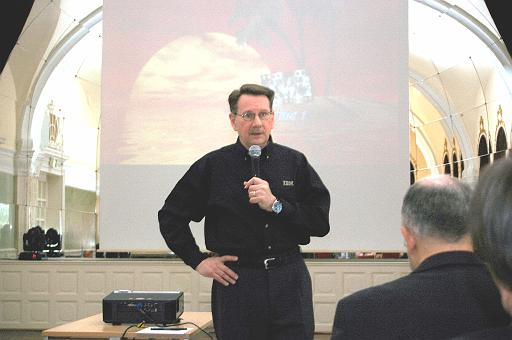
Frank Soltis 2008

Frank Gerald Soltis (born 1940), is an American computer scientist. He joined IBM Rochester in 1969, and is most well known for his contributions to the System/38 and IBM AS/400 architectures, in particular – the design of the single-level store used in those platforms, and the RS64 processor architecture. He retired from IBM in 2008 upon the merger of the System i and System p product lines into IBM Power Systems. Prior to his retirement, he held the title of Chief Scientist at IBM.

== Career ==
In 1968, Soltis completed his PhD in electrical engineering from Iowa State University. His PhD dissertation was titled "Automatic Allocation of Digital Computer Storage Resources for Time-sharing".

In November 1968, he took a position with IBM in Rochester, Minnesota. Soltis led the design of the "Amazon" instruction set architecture, an extended version of the 64-bit PowerPC architecture; the Amazon architecture is implemented by the RS64, POWER4, and POWER5 processors used in the IBM iSeries and pSeries computers.

In the 1990s and early 2000s, in addition to his IBM responsibilities, Soltis served as an adjunct professor of electrical engineering at the University of Minnesota where he taught graduate courses on high performance computer design.

Soltis retired from IBM on December 31, 2008 after 40 years with the company.

In February 2009, Vision Solutions announced that Soltis had joined their Technology Advisory Board.

Soltis' By Design column appears in iPro Developer magazine. His books include Inside the AS/400 and Fortress Rochester, The Inside Story of the IBM iSeries.

== Books ==
- Soltis, Frank G. (1997). Inside the AS/400, Duke Press. ISBN 1-882419-66-9
- Soltis, Frank G. (2001). Fortress Rochester: the Inside Story of the IBM iSeries, NEWS/400 Books. ISBN 1-58304-083-8
