= Bob O. Evans =

American computer pioneer (1927–2004)

Bob Overton Evans (August 19, 1927 – September 2, 2004), also known as "Boe" Evans, was an American computer pioneer and corporate executive at IBM (International Business Machines). He led the groundbreaking development of compatible computers that changed the industry.

== Early life and education ==
Evans was born in Grand Island, Nebraska. In 1951, after earning an engineering degree from Iowa State University, he joined IBM as a junior engineer.

== Career ==
Bob O. Evans joined IBM in a low level engineering position in 1951 as it was developing a new range of "computers" based on vacuum tubes (earlier IBM computers used mechanical switches). A natural and very capable manager he moved up the company hierarchy to the position of vice president (development) in the Data Systems division in 1962. This was apparently created as a position where he had responsibility for the development of "System/360", a merger of IBMs separate scientific and business computing systems.

In the early 1960s, Evans persuaded IBM’s chairman, Thomas J. Watson Jr., to discontinue the company’s development of a hodgepodge of incompatible computers and instead to embark on the development of a single product line of general-purpose, compatible computers. Until then, researchers thought that the fields of scientific computing and commercial data processing each required their own type of special-purpose computer. Compatibility would ensure that the same software could run on any model of the product line, avoiding a re-programming of software.

Evans had overall responsibility for the hardware and software development of what was announced on April 7, 1964, as the IBM System/360 product line, with six models (later gradually expanded to 18 models) and a performance range factor of 50. IBM – in 1964 a company with an annual revenue of $3.2 billion – invested more than $5 billion in engineering, factories and equipment to develop and manufacture System/360, opening five plants and hiring 60,000 employees. In the lead article about System/360 in the IBM Journal of Research and Development, April 1964, only Evans was acknowledged by name, in these words: “The scope of the compatibility objective and of the whole System/360 undertaking was largely due to B. O. Evans, Data Systems Division Vice President–Development.”

After a stint as president of IBM’s Federal Systems Division, in 1969 Evans was named president of IBM’s Systems Development Division (SDD). He was responsible for the development of what was announced on June 30, 1970 as the IBM System/370 product line, initially with three models, later gradually expanded to 17 models. The hardware was supported by four main operating systems. Any application that had run on System/360 could run on System/370. Equally important, where most of the processing on System/360 had been batch-oriented, with only the beginnings of interactive processing, new features of the System/370 opened the door to explosive growth in online transaction processing.

SDD and a successor, the Systems Communications Division, also with Evans as its president, developed a communications architecture and a set of architecture-compliant communication product lines that were announced in 1974 under the banner of Systems Network Architecture (SNA).

Evans was also responsible for IBM’s Future Systems (FS) project. The project was terminated in 1975, in part because of anticipated software incompatibilities between FS and 360/370. On another front, IBM each year was doubling its shipments of online workstations, a market segment it had created around the IBM 3270 display system. Competition was starting to do better, and IBM began to lose market share in one of its "own" segments.

In 1977 IBM named Evans senior vice president for engineering, programming, and technology. He left IBM in 1984. From 1981 until 1995, Evans was chief scientific advisor to the government in Taiwan. From 1984 on, he was a partner of Hambrecht & Quist, and managing partner of Technology Strategies and Alliances. The latter company merged and became Rocket Ventures, of which he was a partner.

Evans died in Hillsborough, California, on September 2, 2004.

== Legacy and honors ==
In a White House ceremony in 1985, Bob Evans and his colleagues, Fred Brooks (responsible for System/360 architecture and design) and Erich Bloch (responsible for System/360 technology) received the National Medal of Technology “for their contributions to […] the IBM System/360, a computer system and technologies which revolutionized the data processing industry.”

- In 1970, Evans was elected to the National Academy of Engineering.
- In 1991, he received the Institute of Electrical and Electronics Engineers’ Computer Pioneer Award, for the development of compatible computers.
- In 2004, he was made a Fellow of the Computer History Museum, “for excellence in management of computer systems, hardware, and software development projects, including the IBM System/360, which revolutionized the computer industry.”

== Acknowledgments ==
In addition to the referenced sources, the following sources were used:

- "Bob Evans, IBM mainframe pioneer, dies at 77". CNET. September 5, 2004. Archived from the original on May 17, 2011.
- “Bob Evans, Who Helped IBM Transform Data Processing, Dies at 77” The New York Times, Sep. 8, 2004;
- "Obituary: Bob Evans". The Independent. September 10, 2004.
