= IBM System =

IBM System - is a common name for IBM products.

== Digit-named series ==
=== Hardware ===
- IBM Personal System/1
  - IBM Personal System/note
- IBM Personal System/2
  - IBM Personal System/2 note
  - IBM Personal System/2 laptop

- IBM System/3
- IBM System/4 Pi
- IBM Office System/6
- IBM System/7
- IBM System/23
- IBM System/3X:
  - IBM System/32
  - IBM System/34
  - IBM System/36
  - IBM System/38
- IBM Personal System/55
  - IBM Personal System/55 note
- IBM System/88

- IBM System/360
- IBM System/370
- IBM System/390
  - IBM System/390 Multiprise

- IBM Advanced System/400

- IBM System Cluster 1350
- IBM 1800 Data Acquisition and Control System
- IBM 3850 Mass Storage System
- IBM 5520 Administrative System
- IBM RISC System/6000
- IBM 7700 Data Acquisition System
- IBM 8100 Information System
- IBM System 9000
- IBM Enterprise System/9000

=== Software ===
- IBM Operating System/2
- IBM Business System 12
- System/360 OS:
  - IBM Basic Operating System/360
  - IBM System/360 Operating System
  - IBM Time Sharing System/360
  - DOS versions:
    - IBM Disk Operating System/360
    - IBM Tape Operating System/360
- IBM 1401 Symbolic Programming System

== Letter-named series ==
=== Hardware ===
- IBM System i
  - IBM System i5
- IBM System p
  - IBM System p5
- IBM System x
- IBM System z
  - IBM System z9
  - IBM System z10

=== Software ===
- IBM System R
- IBM SystemT

== Word-named series ==
=== Hardware ===
Models and lines:

- IBM Displaywriter System
- IBM FlashSystem
- IBM Flex System
- IBM Power Systems
- IBM Personal System/ValuePoint
- IBM Personal System/V
- IBM System Storage
- IBM Q System
  - IBM Q System One
  - IBM Q System Two
- IBM XIV Storage System
- IBM zEnterprise System

Technologies:

- IBM Standard Modular System

=== Software ===
- IBM Administrative Terminal System
- IBM Cross System Product
- IBM Group Control System
- IBM Information Management System
- IBM Internet Security Systems
- IBM Programming Language/Systems
- IBM Structured Query Language/Data System
- IBM Systems Application Architecture
- IBM Systems Network Architecture
- IBM System Object Model
- IBM System Support Program
- IBM PowerHA SystemMirror
- File systems:
  - IBM Journaled File System
  - IBM SAN File System

== See also ==
- IBM Series/1
- IBM Future Systems project
- System request button
- IBM platform (disambiguation)
- List of IBM products (Operating systems)
