= IBM platform (disambiguation) =

The term IBM platform could refer to any of the hardware and operating systems below.

== Current ==
- IBM Power Systems, a family name for the merged System p and System i
- PureSystems, an IBM product line of factory pre-configured components and servers also being referred to as an "Expert Integrated System"
- IBM Z, a family name used by IBM for all of its z/Architecture mainframe computers from the Z900 on; this is the most recent architecture descended from IBM System/360
  - IBM System z, an older name for IBM Z
  - IBM z System, an older name for IBM Z
- IBM PC compatible, a machine compatible with the IBM PC and successors.
- IBM i, an operating system that runs on IBM Power Systems and IBM PureSystems, preceded by:
  - CPF, the operating system for the S/38
  - OS/400, the operating system for the AS/400
  - i5/OS, the operating system for the eServer i5
- z/OS, a 64-bit operating system for IBM mainframes; this is the most recent incarnation of OS/360 and successors

== Discontinued ==
- IBM System i, preceded by S/38, AS/400 and eServer i5, is a line of midrange computer systems from IBM that uses the IBM i operating system
- IBM System p, formerly known as RS/6000, was IBM's RISC/UNIX-based server product line.
- IBM System/360, the predecessor to S/370
- IBM System/370, the predecessor to XA/370
- IBM Extended Architecture/370 (XA/370), the predecessor to ESA/370
- IBM Enterprise Systems Architecture/370 (ESA/370), the predecessor to IBM System/390
- IBM System/390, the predecessor to IBM System z
- IBM Personal Computer, commonly known as the IBM PC, is the original version of the IBM PC compatible hardware platform
- Operating System/360 (OS/360), IBM's flagship operating system for S/360 and early S/370
- OS/VS1, successor to OS/360 MFT
- SVS, OS/VS2 Release 1, successor to OS/360 MVT and predecessor to MVS
- MVS/370 is a generic term for all versions of the MVS operating system prior to MVS/XA
  - OS/VS2 Release 2 through 3.8
  - MVS/System Extension (MVS/SE)
  - MVS/System Product (MVS/SP) Version 1
- MVS/XA, predecessor of MVS/ESA
- MVS/ESA, predecessor of OS/390
- OS/390, predecessor of z/OS
- Suprercomputer platforms:
  - IBM RS/6000 SP (1993-2000)
  - QCDOC (1998-1999)
  - IBM Blue Gene (1999-2015)
  - IBM iDataPlex (2008-2014)
  - IBM PERCS (2011)
  - IBM Intelligent Cluster, (2001-2014, now Lenovo Intelligent Cluster)

== See also ==
- IBM System (disambiguation)
