= ThinkSystem =

Line of servers by Lenovo

ThinkSystem is a family of Intel and AMD servers from Lenovo. The line began as the ThinkServer with the TS100 in 2008. The ThinkServer family has been discontinued in 2019, and the new family of Intel servers is named ThinkSystem.

== ThinkServer ==
ThinkServer
- Developer: Lenovo
- Type: Desktop (T###) or Rack-mounted (R###) server
- Released: 2008
- Discontinued: 2018 (except in China, where it is still available)
- Predecessor: IBM eServer xSeries
- Successor: Lenovo ThinkSystem

The server was developed under agreement with IBM, by which Lenovo would produce single-socket and dual-socket servers based on IBM's xSeries technology. An additional feature of the server design was a support package aimed at small businesses. The focus of this support package was to provide small businesses with software tools to ease the process of server management and reduce dependence on IT support. The tools developed for this support package included:

- EasyStartup – meant to simplify the initial server configuration
- EasyUpdate – for download and installation of hardware and firmware updates
- EasyManage – to monitor the performance of multiple servers from a single console

Lenovo ThinkServer product line
		2008	2009	2010	2011	2012	2013	2014	2015	2016	2017	2018	2019
Tower servers
1 socket		TS100	TS200	TS200v	TS130		TS140			TS150			
1 socket					TS430		TS440			TS450	TS460		
2 sockets			TD100	TD200									
2 sockets			TD100x	TD200x									
2 sockets				TD230		TD330	TD340	TD350					
Rack servers
Storage only	2 units							SA120					
1 socket	1 unit		RS110					RS140			RS160		
1 socket	2 units		RS210										
0.5U Bay	2 units					?				N400			
2 sockets	0.5 unit					SD330				SD350			
2 sockets	1 unit		RD120	RD230		RD330		RD340	RD350				
2 sockets	1 unit					RD530	RD540	RD550					
2 sockets	2 units		RD210	RD220		RD430		RD440	RD450				
2 sockets	2 units					RD430x							
2 sockets	2 units			RD240		RD630	RD640	RD650					
80 sockets	44 units						DC5000						

Lenovo's ThinkServer naming conventions reflect whether the server is a tower server or a rack server. First letter "T" is used to indicate tower servers, while "R" is used for rack servers, and "S" is storage rack server. Similarly, secondary letter "S" indicates single socket, while "D" indicates dual-socket.

== 2014 ==
=== Rack ===
==== RS140 ====
1U

==== RD340 ====
1U

==== RD440 ====
2U

==== RD550 ====
1U server.

- Processors: 2× Intel Xeon E5-2600 v3 series
- Memory: Up to 768 GB RDIMM\LV RDIMM DDR4 (24 slots)

==== RD650 ====
2U server.

- Processors: 2× Intel Xeon E5-2600 v3 series
- Memory: Up to 768 GB RDIMM\LV RDIMM DDR4 (24 slots)

== 2013 ==
In September 2013, Lenovo announced the TS140 and the TS440 replacing the TS130 and TS430.

=== TS140 ===
The TS140 added USB 3.0 ports and an on-board 6 GB SATA storage controller supporting RAID 0/1/10/5. The TS140 was made significantly quieter, with Lenovo claiming as low as 26 db. Using four 3.5" HDDs, it can support up to 24 TB of data storage.

Detailed specifications of the server are as follows:

- Processor:
  - Intel Xeon E3-1200 v3 series (up to quad core 3.7 GHz)
  - Intel Core i3 4000 series (up to dual core 3.7 GHz)
  - Intel Pentium G3200/G3400 series (up to dual core 3.4 GHz)
  - Intel Celeron G18 (up to dual core 2.9 GHz)
- Chipset: Intel C226
- RAM: up to 32 GB DDR3 ECC UDIMM
- Graphics:
  - Intel HD Graphics
  - NVIDIA Quadro NVS 300 (512 MB)
  - NVIDIA Quadro K600 (1 GB)
- Bays:
  - Two 5.25" (used for optical drive and additional 3.5-inch drives)
  - Two 3.5"
- Optical drive: DVD-ROM or DVD±RW
- Operating system:
  - Windows Server R2 (Foundation, Standard, Enterprise)
  - Windows Server 2012 (Foundation, Essentials, Standard)
  - Windows Small Business Server (Essentials, Standard, Premium Add-on)
- Manageability:
  - ThinkServer EasyStartup, EasyUpdate, Power Planner, and Diagnostics
  - Intel Advanced Management Technology 9.0 with remote KVM (Xeon models)
  - Intel Standard Manageability tools (Pentium, Celeron and Core i3 models)
  - Trusted Platform Module
  - Unified Extensible Firmware Interface (UEFI)
- Weight: up to 28.66 lbs (13 kg)
- Dimensions: 6.88” x 16.96” x 14.76”(175 mm x 431 mm x 375 mm)
- Ports: Six USB 3.0, two USB 2.0, two DisplayPort, DB-15 VGA port, DB-9 serial port, RJ-45 GbE network port

== 2012 ==
In November 2012, Lenovo's new Enterprise Product Group launched the TD330, featuring up to 192 GB of memory and supporting up to 16 processor cores. It is built around Xeon E5-2400 processors from Intel and is available in energy-saving models compliant with Energy Star standards.

== 2011 ==
Lenovo launched the ThinkServer models TS130 and TS430 in June 2011.

=== TS130 ===
The TS130 was a ThinkServer model launched by Lenovo in 2011 primarily for small businesses. This server was intended to replace Lenovo's 2010 entry-level offering, the TS200v. The server was equipped with Windows Small Business Server 2011 Essentials along with Intel Active Management Technology (AMT) 7.0. The TS130 was summarized by Andrew Jeffries, worldwide product manager for ThinkServer, as ”The TS130 offers a wonderful first-server solution to anyone that has a tiny IT staff or has no IT staff but needs a true server solution”.

Detailed specifications of the server are as follows:

- Processor:
  - Intel Xeon E3-1200 series
  - Intel Core i3
  - Intel Pentium
  - Intel Celeron
- RAM: up to 16 GB ECC
- Chipset: Intel 206 series
- Bays: two 3.5"
- Operating system:
  - Windows Server 2008 R2 (Enterprise, Foundation, Standard Edition)
  - Windows Small Business Server 2011 (Essentials, Standard, Premium Add-On)
- Management:
  - Intel Advanced Management Technology (AMT) 7.0 with remote KVM
  - Intel Standard Manageability

=== TS430 ===
Techpowerup, quoting Lenovo's press release, stated, "The all-new, highly scalable ThinkServer TS430 sets a new standard in its class with options for an enormous 16 TB of hot swap storage capacity, powerful SAS RAID data protection and redundant power choices for peace of mind. It suits demanding environments requiring high capacity, high performance and 24×7 uptime." The press release also indicated that the TS430 was "rack-able" and offered features like hard disk drive access from the front of the server, as well as the ThinkServer Management Module with iKVM.

The TS430 was announced in June 2011 by Lenovo with the following specifications:

- Processor:
  - Up to Intel Xeon E3-1280
  - Up to Intel Core G850
- RAM: up to 32 GB ECC (4 slots)
- Storage: up to 16 TB hot swap
- Weight: 25 kg
- Operating system:
  - Windows Server 2008 R2 (Foundation, Standard Edition)
  - Windows Small Business Server 2011 (Essentials, Standard, Premium Add-On)
  - Novell SUSE Linux Enterprise Server (SLES) 11.1
  - Red Hat Enterprise Linux 6.0
  - VMWare ESX/ESXi 4.0, 4.1
- Manageability:
  - IMM on shared Ethernet port
  - KVM with the ThinkServer Management Module
  - IPMI 2.0 or SOL
  - Trusted Platform Module

== 2010 ==
Lenovo released ThinkServer TD200, TD200x, TS200v, TD230, RD220, RD230, and RD240 in 2010.

=== Tower ===
==== TD200 ====
The TD200 server offered the following specifications:

- Processors: 2× Intel Xeon E5502 (Quad-core 1.86 GHz)
- Chipset: Intel 5520
- RAM: up to 96 GB DDR3 SDRAM ECC (12 slots)
- Bays:
  - Four front accessible simple swap 5.25"
  - Four 3.5"

==== TD200x ====
The TD200x server offered higher specifications as compared to the TD200. Detailed specifications of the server are as follows:

- Processors: 2× Intel Xeon E5530 (Quad-core 2.4 GHz)
- Chipset: Intel 5520
- RAM: up to 128 GB DDR3 SDRAM ECC (16 slots)
- Bays
  - Eight 5.25" hot swap
  - Three front accessible 2.5"
- Operating system:
  - Windows Server 2008 (Standard or Enterprise)
  - Windows Small Business Server 2008 (Standard or Premium)
  - Windows Essential Business Server 2008 (Standard or Premium)
  - Windows Small Business Server 2003 (Standard or Premium)
  - Novell SUSE Linux Enterprise Server (SLES) 10 32/64 bit

==== TD230 ====
The TD230 was a tower server released by Lenovo in 2010 with the following specifications:

- Processors: 2× Intel Xeon E5620 (Quad-core 2.4 GHz)
- Chipset: Intel 5500
- RAM: up to 32 GB DDR3 SDRAM ECC (8 slots)
- Bays:
  - Two front accessible 5.25"
  - Four hot swap 3.5"
- Operating system:
  - Microsoft Windows Server 2008 (Standard or Enterprise) R2
  - Microsoft Windows Small Business Server 2008 (Standard or Premium) SP2
  - Novell SUSE Linux 11
  - Red Hat RHEL 5
- Manageability:
  - iBMc
  - Web Remote Management

==== TS200v ====
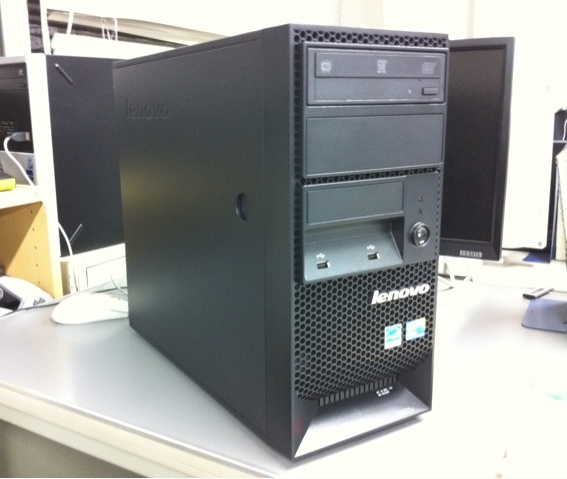
TS200v value tower server

The TS200v was described by PCMag as a good choice for small businesses. While the server offered adequate performance, the review indicated that the use of Windows Server 2008 R2 foundation required the use of a knowledgeable Windows technician to set up and configure the server.

Additional specifications for the server are given below:

- Operating system: Windows Server 2008 R2
- Storage: 250 GB (maximum)
  - RAID Level: RAID 0, RAID 1
- Management tools:
  - Intel Active Management Technology
  - Intel Remote PC Assistance Technology

=== Rack ===
==== RD220 ====
RD220 was a rack-mountable serve released in 2010. It was described by COMPUTERWORLD as such:

The Lenovo ThinkServer RD220 is a good middle of the road server with good build quality, redundancy and solid disk performance although there are better servers in this class in terms of overall features for your dollar.

The RD220 server offered the following specifications:

- Processors: 2× Intel Xeon 5500 series
- Chipset: Intel 5520
- RAM: up to 48 GB DDR3 (1, 2 or 4 GB Advanced ECC modules) R-DIMM (16 slots)
- Operating system:
  - Microsoft Windows Server 2008 (Standard or Enterprise)
  - Microsoft Windows Small Business Server 2008 (Standard or Premium)
  - Microsoft Windows Essential Business Server 2008 (Standard or Premium)
  - Microsoft Windows Small Business Server 2003 (Standard or Premium)
  - Novell SUSE Linux Enterprise Server (SLES) 10 32/64 bit
- Manageability:
  - Built-in IMM (optional IMM Premium)
  - EasyManage
  - Onboard virtualization connector

==== RD230 ====
The RD230 was a single unit rack-mountable server released by Lenovo in 2010 with the following specifications:

- Processors: 2× Intel Xeon 5500 or 5600 series
- Chipset: Intel 5500
- RAM: up to 64 GB DDR3 SDRAM ECC (8 slots)
- Bays:
  - One front accessible 5.25"
  - Four hot swap 3.5"
- Operating systems:
  - Microsoft Windows Server 2008 (Standard or Enterprise) R2
  - Microsoft Windows Small Business Server 2008 (Standard or Premium) SP2
  - Novell SUSe Linux 11
  - Red Hat Enterprise Linux 6
  - VMware vSphere 4.0
- Manageability:
  - Web-enabled iBMC
  - iKvM Management

==== RD240 ====
Like the RD230, the RD240 was also a rack-mountable server, but with a 2U case. Released by Lenovo in 2010 with the following specifications:

- Processors: 2× Intel Xeon E5607 (Quad-core 2.26 GHz)
- Chipset: Intel 5500
- RAM: up to 64 GB DDR3 SDRAM ECC (8 slots)
- Bays:
  - One front accessible 5.25"
  - Eight hot swap 3.5"
- Operating systems:
  - Microsoft Windows Server 2008 (Standard or Enterprise) R2
  - Microsoft Windows Small Business Server 2008 (Standard or Premium) SP2
  - Novell SUSE Linux 11
  - Red Hat Enterprise Linux 6
- Manageability:
  - Web-enabled iBMC
  - iKvM Management
  - Remote Management

== 2009 ==
The ThinkServer models released in 2009 by Lenovo were the TD100, TD100x, RS110, RD120, RD210, TS200, and TD200.

=== Tower ===
==== TD100 ====
The TD100 was released by Lenovo in 2010 with the following specifications:

- Processors: 2× Intel Xeon E5400 series
- Chipset: Intel 5000
- RAM: Up to 32 GB 667 MHz DDR2 FBDIMM
- Operating system:
  - Microsoft Windows Server 2008 (Standard or Premium)
  - Microsoft Windows Small Business Server 2003 R2 (Standard or Premium)
  - Novell SUSE Linux Enterprise Server
- Manageability:
  - ThinkServer EasyStartup (for server startup and configuration)
  - ThinkServer EasyUpdate (for firmware updates)
  - ThinkServer EasyManage (for hardware monitoring and alerts)
  - PC-Doctor Diagnostics
  - IPMI 2.0

==== TD100x ====
The TD100x was also released in 2009 with the following specifications:

- Processors: 2× Intel Xeon 5000 series
- Chipset: Intel 5000P
- RAM: Up to 48 GB 667 MHz DDR2 FBDIMM (12 slots) with Advanced ECC
- Operating system:
  - Microsoft Windows Server 2008 (Standard or Premium)
  - Microsoft Windows Server 2003 (Standard or Premium)
  - Microsoft Windows Small Business Server 2003 R2 (Standard or Premium)
  - Novell SUSE Linux Enterprise Server
- Manageability:
  - ThinkServer EasyStartup (for server startup and configuration)
  - ThinkServer EasyUpdate (for firmware updates)
  - ThinkServer EasyManage (for hardware monitoring and alerts)
  - PC-Doctor Diagnostics
  - IPMI 2.0

==== TS200 ====
The TS200 was announced by Lenovo in September 2009, along with the RS210. It was a tower server with the following specifications:

- Processor: Intel Xeon X3450 (Quad-core 2.66 GHz)
- Chipset: Intel 3420
- RAM: up to 32 GB DDR3 SDRAM ECC (6 slots)
- Optical drive: DVD reader/writer
- Bays: four 3.5-inch hot-swap hard drives
- Operating system:
  - Microsoft Windows Server 2008 (Standard or Enterprise) R2 edition
  - Microsoft Windows Server 2008 SBS Standard
  - Microsoft Windows Foundations R2
  - Novell SUSE Linux Enterprise Server (SLES) 11 with Xen hypervisor
  - Red Hat Enterprise Linux 5.3
  - VMware ESX Server 4.0 & 4.0i
- Manageability:
  - IMM with IPMI 2.0
  - Hardware key for remote presence
  - Trusted Platform Module 1.2

=== Rack ===
==== RS110 ====
The RS110 server was summed up by PCPro as being “a low-cost general purpose rack server with a good spec and a support package that will appeal to small business.” The server was reported to resemble IBM's servers and incorporating the same level of build quality.

The server's front panel offered two 3.5-inch drive bays. The hard disks were mounted in removable carriers, despite the fact that the server only supported cold swap. A single socket server, the processor on offer was the 2.4 GHz Intel Core 2 Duo processor. An intense cooling system was incorporated, with a large heatsink and an array of pipes, with three small fans addressing cooling needs. Despite the presence of three fans, the server's noise levels were low. Power utilization was also low, with the server drawing 65 W when idle and 94 W at peak performance.

==== RD120 ====
The RD120 server was described by PCPro as “a good-value 2U rack server with a decent spec, plenty of room to upgrade, and a support package.” This model was described as being “essentially an IBM System x3650” with “classy build quality”.

The server supported up to six 3.5" SATA or SAS hot swap HDD. Upgrades to the server included conversion options to eight 2.5 inch or four 3.5" HDD with an internal tape drive with external storage arrays. Power consumption was recorded as being 45 W on standby, 203 W with the OS on idle, and 289 W with the processor's capabilities tested intensively.

==== RD210 ====
The RD210 server was released by Lenovo in 2009. It was summarized by a reviewer of ZDNet as “Lenovo's RD210 makes perfect sense if you're a small business that just needs a grunty all-purpose 1RU server.”

Detailed specifications of the server are as follows:

- Processors: 2× Intel Xeon 5500 Series
- Chipset: Intel 5520
- RAM: up to 48 GB DDR3 (1, 2 or 4 GB Advanced ECC modules) R-DIMM (16 slots)
- Operating system:
  - Windows Server 2008 (Standard or Enterprise)
  - Windows Small Business Server 2008 (Standard or Premium)
  - Windows Essential Business Server 2008 (Standard or Premium)
  - Windows Small Business Server 2003 (Standard or Premium)
  - Novell SUSE Linux Enterprise Server (SLES) 10 32/64 bit
- Manageability:
  - Built-in IMM (optional IMM Premium)
  - EasyManage
  - Onboard virtualization connector

==== RS210 ====
The RS210 was announced by Lenovo in September 2009, along with the TS200. It was a rack server with specifications similar to those of the TS200. The processor, chipset, and RAM were the same. However, the four available hot swap bays were designed for 2.5 inch HDD.

== 2008 ==
The ThinkServer model released in 2008 by Lenovo was the TS100.

=== TS100 ===
The TS100 was described by PCPro as having rock-solid build quality. It was described as being very similar to IBM's X3200 M2 pedestal server. The front of the server offered room for two 5.25" bays, beneath which was a hot swap bay with the capacity to support four HDD. The server's side panel could be locked, while the bay cover could not be secured. The hard disk bay was equipped with its own fan assembly, in spite of the 12 cm fan at the chassis’ rear. Despite the presence of multiple fans, the TS100 was described as being very quiet after startup.
