= IBM System/3X =

IBM System/3X was a line of general business midrange computers that were developed and marketed by IBM beginning in 1975. The IBM AS/400, a successor system that was introduced in 1988, was based on a combination of the System/36 and System/38 computers. The IBM i operating system running on top of IBM Power Systems maintains backwards compatibility with some of the System/3x series operating systems.

== Series ==
- IBM System/32, released 1975
- IBM System/34, released 1978
- IBM System/36, released 1983
- IBM System/38, released 1979

== See also ==
- IBM midrange computer
- IBM System/3
- IBM System (disambiguation)
