= Silver Lake (Rochester, Minnesota) =

Reservoir in southeastern Minnesota

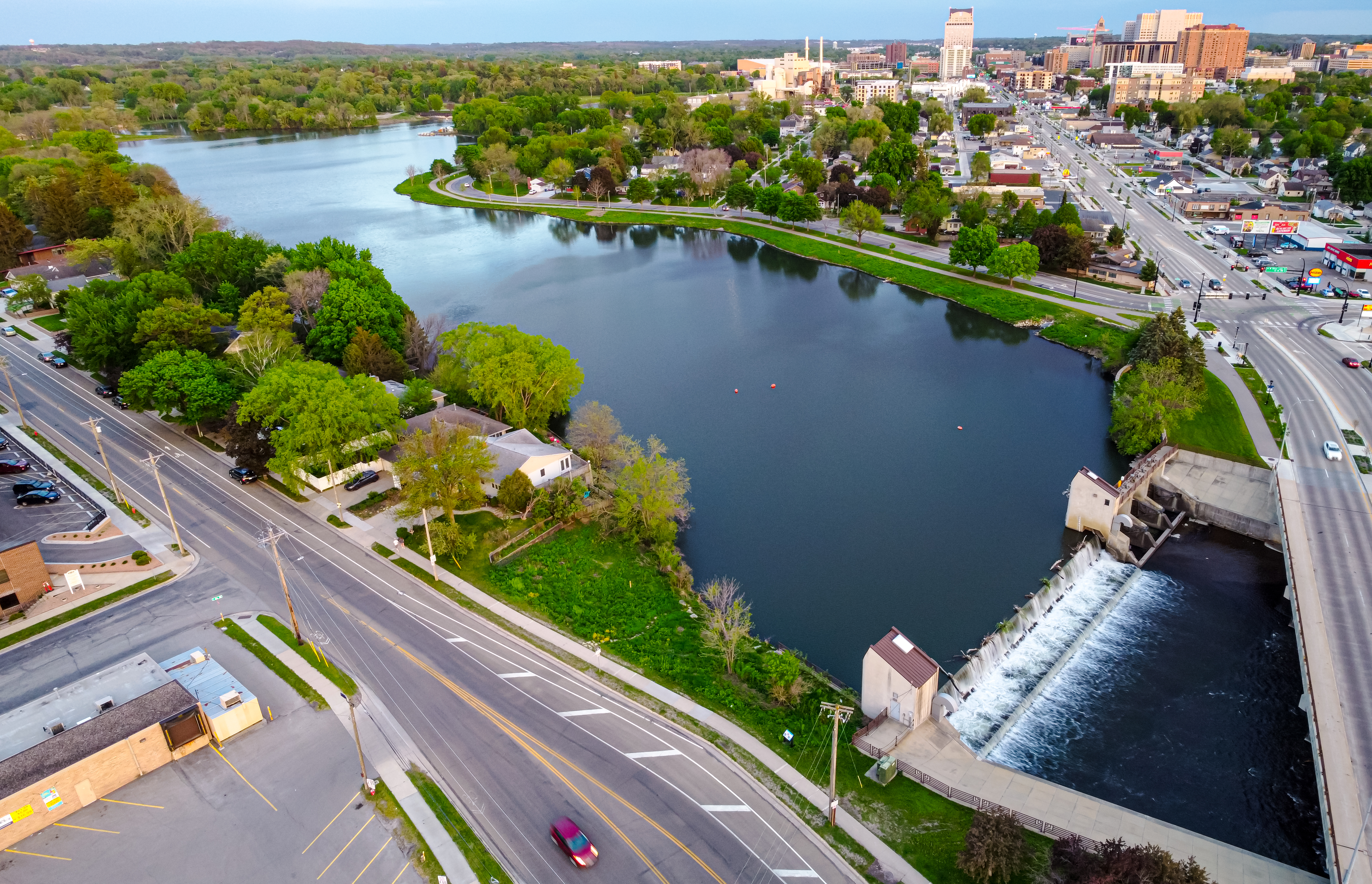

- Location within Minnesota Location within the United States
- Location: Rochester, Minnesota, United States
- Coordinates: 44.0333°N 92.4571°W
- Basin countries: United States
- Surface area: 50 acres (20 ha)
- Max. depth: 11 ft (3.4 m)
- Settlements: Rochester, Minnesota

Silver Lake is a small, freshwater reservoir in southeastern Minnesota.

== Description ==
The lake lies on the South Fork of the Zumbro River, about one-half mile north of downtown Rochester.

The electrical power plant operated by Rochester Public Utilities used the lake for cooling. Since the lake operates as a heat sink, it doesn't freeze in the winter. The warm water attracted a large number of Canada geese that remain in the area year round. (The RPU plant has since shut down, and the lake now freezes during the winter. Rochester government has been implementing various plans to cull the Canada goose population. These plans include egg oiling, which was performed by volunteers in 2021. The city of Rochester is also planning of replacing eggs with ceramic replacements in the spring of 2022 in order to curb the presence of the geese.)

A public park surrounds most of the lake. In the summer, paddleboat and canoe rental is available.

Silver Lake is the home to the Rochester Rowing Club, whose members practice there daily.

As of November 2026, the damage that created the lake has been removed. Accumulate silt will be removed to increase the lake depth to 4-5 feet, and the dam will be replaced by an articial series if rapids that allow passage of fish and small paddle craft.
