= PowerLinux =

Linux operating system running on IBM Power Architectures

PowerLinux is the combination of a Linux-based operating system (OS) running on PowerPC- or Power ISA-based computers from IBM. It is often used in reference along with Linux on Power, and is also the name of several Linux-only IBM Power Systems.

== IBM and Linux ==
In the late 1990s, IBM began considering the Linux operating system. In 2000, IBM announced it would promote Linux. In 2001, IBM invested $1 billion to back the Linux movement, embracing it as an operating system for IBM servers and software. Within a decade, Linux could be found in virtually every IBM business, geography and workload, and continues to be deeply embedded in IBM hardware, software, services and internal development.

A survey released by the Linux Foundation in April 2012 showed IBM as the fifth-leading commercial contributor over the past seven years, with more than 600 developers involved in more than 100 open-source projects.

IBM established the Linux Technology Center (LTC) in 1999 to combine its software developers interested in Linux and other open-source software into a single organization. The LTC collaborated with the Linux community to make Linux run optimally on PowerPC, x86, and more recently, the Cell Broadband Engine. Developers in the LTC contribute to various open-source projects as well as projects focused on enabling Linux to use new hardware functions on IBM platforms.

Linux has run on IBM POWER systems since 2001, when a team created a new, 64-bit port for the Linux kernel to allow the OS to run on PowerPC processors. The first system to fully support the 64-bit Linux kernel was IBM's POWER5, created in 2004. It was followed by POWER6 in 2007 and the current POWER7-based systems in 2010.

== PowerLinux Servers ==
Linux was first ported to POWER in June 2000. Since then PowerLinux was used in a number of supercomputers including MareNostrum 2004 and Roadrunner 2008.

Beginning in April 2012, IBM introduced three POWER7 processor-based Linux-specific systems for big data analytics, industry applications and open-source infrastructure services such as Web-serving, email and social media collaboration services. Linux-specific servers do not support IBM AIX or IBM i, the company's other operating systems for Power computers.

The IBM PowerLinux 7R1 and IBM PowerLinux 7R2 systems are one- and two-socket, rack-mount servers that support either 8 or 16 POWER7 microprocessor cores in 3.55 GHz (7R1 only) or, with the 7R2, 3.55 and 3.3 GHz options with 128 GB maximum memory (for the 7R1) or 256 GB maximum memory (7R2) that can be configured with 8, 16 and 32 GB dual inline memory modules (DIMMs). Both systems run Linux operating systems: Red Hat Enterprise Linux or SUSE Linux Enterprise Server and include a built-in PowerVM [for PowerLinux] hypervisor that supports up to 10 VMs per core and 160 VMs per server.

The IBM PowerLinux 7R4 is a POWER7+ processor-based system in a 5U package with two or four sockets and 16 or 32 cores. It can accommodate up to 1 TB of 1066 MHz DDR3 Active Memory Sharing. PowerVM for Linux dynamically adjusts system resources to partitions based on workload demands-across up to 640 VMs per server (20 micropartitions per core).

In a study on systems and architecture for big data, IBM Research found that a 10-node Hadoop cluster of PowerLinux 7R2 nodes with POWER7+ processors, running InfoSphere BigInsights software, can sort through a terabyte of data in less than 8 minutes.

IBM also introduced the IBM Flex System p24L Compute Node, a Linux-specific two-socket compute node for the recently announced IBM PureFlex System, which contains 12 or 16 POWER7 microprocessor cores, up to 256 GB of memory, the option of Red Hat Enterprise Linux or SUSE Linux Enterprise Server operating systems and built-in PowerVM for PowerLinux.

In addition to these specific products, Linux is capable of running on any Power series hardware.

== PowerLinux versus Linux/x86 ==
The April 2012 releases by IBM of PowerLinux were designed specifically to run the Linux kernel on the company's POWER7-based systems. Unlike servers built on the Intel Xeon processor, an x86 descendant with two threads per core, the POWER7 processor provides four threads per core. POWER-based servers are virtualized to provide 60 to 80 percent utilization, compared to a typical 40-percent rate for x86 processors. The PowerVM virtualization program has a Common Criteria Evaluation Assurance (CC) level of 4+, with zero security vulnerabilities reported, as well as unlimited memory use.

== About PowerVM virtualization ==
Power-based IBM systems have built in virtualization capabilities derived from mainframe technology. On System p, this virtualization package is referred to as PowerVM. PowerVM includes virtualization capabilities such as micro-partitioning, active memory sharing and de-duplication, a virtual I/O server for virtual networks and storage, as well as live partition mobility.

== Systems ==
PowerLinux runs on:

- AmigaOne
- AmigaOne X1000
- Cell blade server from Mercury Computer Systems
- IBM Power Systems
- Bladecenter Nodes: JS43, JS23, JS20, JS21, QS20, QS21, QS22 Blade Center
- Linux on the PlayStation 3
- Genesi Pegasos
- Sam440ep
- Sam460ex
