= IBM C2T =

Cable chaining technology

C2T (an abbreviation for Cable Chaining Technology) is an IBM technology for KVM (keyboard, video, mouse) chaining.

C2T, built into some of the IBM's xSeries and Netfinity models, allows daisy-chaining up to forty-two compatible servers in a single rack. Servers are daisy-chained using a special purpose cable which is included with new servers. The final server in the stack is connected to a monitor/keyboard/mouse or a KVM switch using a C2T breakout cable, which provides PS/2 and VGA connectors. The breakout cable was once very expensive to purchase new, but are now obtainable for less than US$30 online.

C2T works thanks to a chip in each server that emulates a KVM switch. To take control of a certain xSeries server in the rack, user needs to press Num Lock twice, "nn" (where "nn" is the number of the server) and then press Enter, or could also manually press the button on the front of the desired xSeries server. The theory behind C2T is to reduce clutter and save money as no KVM switch is required.
