= IBM eServer =

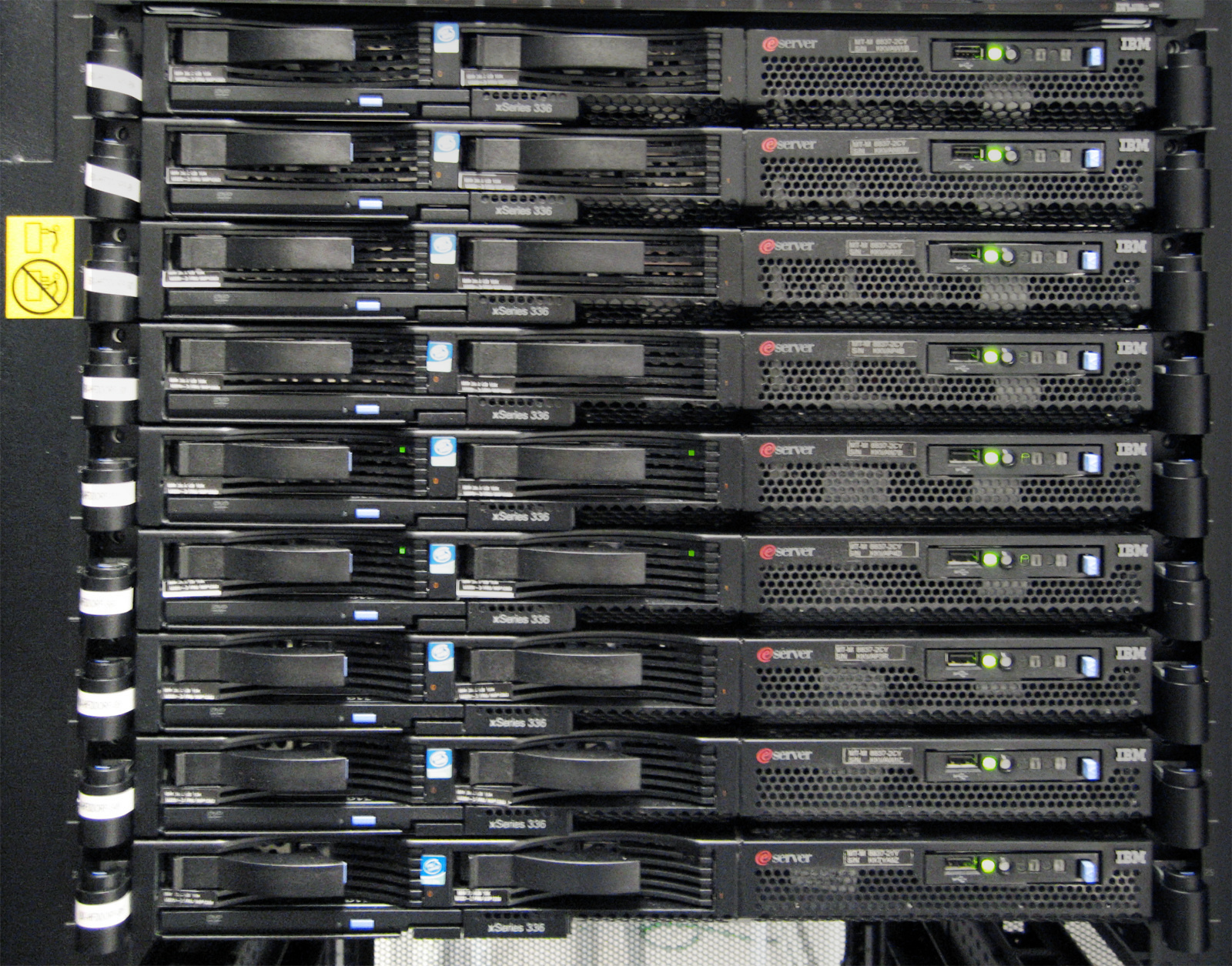
- IBM xSeries 336 servers
- Developer: IBM
- Type: Desktop server or Rack-mounted server
- Released: 2000
- Discontinued: 2006

IBM eServer was IBM's unified brand name for its server computers. Announced in 2000, it combined the various previous brands (AS/400, Netfinity, RS/6000, S/390). Five years later, IBM began retiring this brand name in favor of the "IBM System", a task completed in 2006.

== Inception ==
Motivated by the faster growth of its rival Sun Microsystems, in 2000, IBM began unifying the development, marketing and sales efforts of its various server groups. Thus, the company's various server product lines became eServer sub-brands:

- IBM RS/6000 was renamed IBM eServer pSeries ("p" for "power").
- IBM AS/400 was renamed IBM eServer iSeries ("i" for "integrated").
- IBM Netfinity was renamed IBM eServer xSeries ("x" for "extended architecture", with respect to "commodity" Intel-based servers).
- IBM System/390 was replaced by the 64-bit IBM eServer zSeries ("z" for |zero downtime").

IBM RS/6000 SP was replaced by IBM Blue Gene.

== Discontinuation ==
In 2005, IBM announced a new brand, IBM System, as an umbrella for all IBM server and storage brands. The rebranding was completed in 2006 when the IBM xSeries became the IBM System x (later the Lenovo System x).

- IBM eServer zSeries became IBM System z
- IBM eServer pSeries became IBM System p
- IBM eServer iSeries became IBM System i
- IBM eServer xSeries became IBM System x (later Lenovo System x)
- IBM TotalStorage became IBM Storage
- IBM eServer BladeCenter became IBM BladeCenter
- IBM eServer 1350 became IBM System Cluster 1350

Preceded by IBM S/390	IBM System z 2000 - 2008: eServer zSeries; 2000 / System z9 2005 / System z10 2008	Succeeded by IBM zEnterprise System
Preceded by IBM RS/6000	IBM System p 2000 - 2008: eServer pSeries; 2000 / eServer p5 2004 / System p5 2005 / System p 2007	Succeeded by IBM Power Systems
Preceded by IBM AS/400	IBM System i 2000 - 2008: eServer iSeries; 2000 / eServer i5 2004 / System i5 2005 / System i 2006	Succeeded by IBM Power Systems
Preceded by IBM Netfinity	IBM System x 2000 - 2014: eServer xSeries; 2000 / System x 2007	Succeeded by Lenovo System x
Preceded by none	IBM BladeCenter; 2000 - 2012: / eServer / -; p Series: / - / JS/QS nodes 2004 / PS nodes 2009; x Series: / x86 HS/HX/JS/JX nodes 2000	Succeeded by IBM Flex System
Preceded by none	IBM BladeCenter; 2000 - 2012: / eServer / -; p Series: / - / JS/QS nodes 2004 / PS nodes 2009; x Series: / x86 HS/HX/JS/JX nodes 2000	Succeeded by IBM iDataPlex
