= IBM SAN File System =

- Developer(s): IBM
- Stable release: 2.2.3-127 / March 2007
- Operating system: Linux (server); AIX, Linux, Solaris, Windows and Windows and Linux VMware guests (Client)
- Type: filesystem
- License: Proprietary
- Website: www.ibm.com

The IBM SAN File System is a distributed, heterogeneous file system developed by IBM to be used in storage area networks. There are many virtualization features included, such as allowing heterogeneous operating systems to access the same data and file spaces. Write-in-place b-trees were used as in the DB2 database, later on better known as core of the btrfs.

IBM discontinued selling the SAN File System in April 2007. It has been replaced by IBM General Parallel File System (GPFS).
