= IBM SystemT =

Information extraction system built in 2005

- Developer: IBM
- Written in: AQL, Java
- Operating system: Linux, macOS, Windows
- Type: Information Extraction, Text mining
- Website: SystemT

IBM SystemT is a declarative information extraction system. It was first built in 2005, as a research project at IBM's IBM Almaden Research Center. Its name is partially inspired by System R, a seminal project from the same research center.

SystemT comprises the following three main components: (1) AQL, a declarative rule language with a similar syntax to SQL; (2) Optimizer, which accepts AQL statements as input and generates high-performance algebraic execution plans; and (3) Executing engine, which executes the plan generated by the Optimizer and performs information extraction over input documents.

SystemT is available as part of IBM BigInsights, and has also been taught in multiple universities around the globe. A version of SystemT was available (starting in September 2016) as a companion to a sequence of online courses in Text Analytics.
