= IBM Intelligent Cluster =

IBM computer cluster

- Also known as: eServer Cluster 1300 (2001) eServer Cluster 1350 (2002); IBM System Cluster 1350 (circa 2008)
- Developer: IBM
- Type: Cluster platform; Supercomputer platform
- Released: 2001
- Discontinued: 2014
- CPU: x86; Power (blades only)
- Successor: Lenovo Intelligent Cluster
- Related: IBM iDataPlex

The IBM Intelligent Cluster was a cluster solution for x86-based high-performance computing composed primarily of IBM (System x, BladeCenter and System Storage) components, integrated with network switches from various vendors and optional high-performance InfiniBand interconnects.

== History ==
The solution was formerly known as the IBM eServer Cluster 1300 (or e1300) based on then-current Pentium III processors, which was introduced in November 2001. This was replaced by the e1350 in October 2002 with the introduction of Pentium 4-based Intel Xeon processors. Later (in 2008-2009) solution also was known as the IBM System Cluster 1350; in 2010 released line with final IBM Intelligent Cluster name.

Roughly twice a year the solution components were updated to include the then-current products from IBM and other vendors.

In 2014 this cluster solution was sold and rebranded as Lenovo Intelligent Cluster.

== Architecture ==
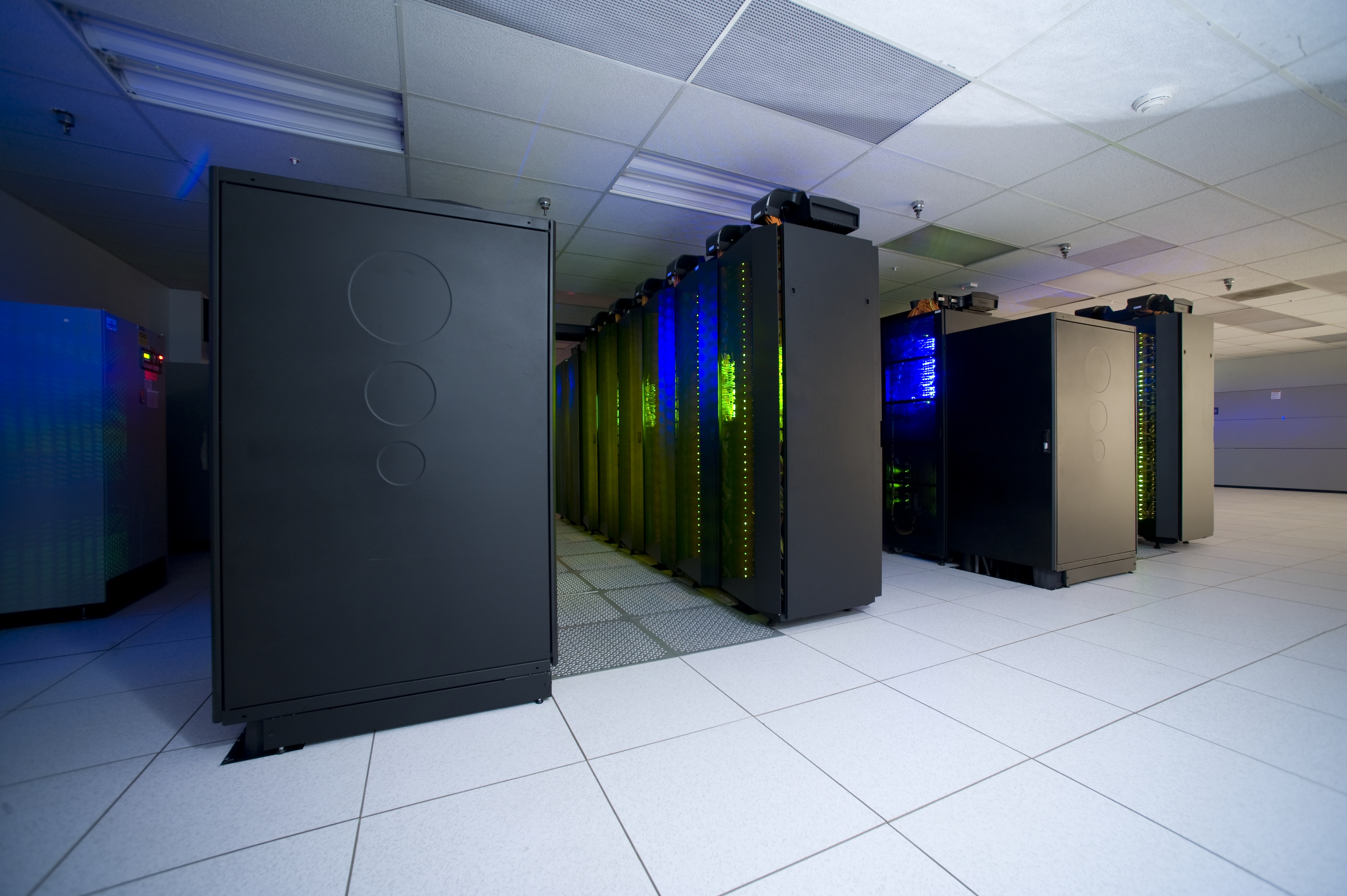
Discover supercomputer - as example of different racks (full-size regular racks and thin iDataPlex) as parts of the Intelligent Cluster

The Intelligent Cluster system is a (integrated, factory-built and tested) rack tower-size cluster solution with comprehensive warranty service for all components, including third-party options. The system could comprise traditional rack-optimized nodes, as well as IBM BladeCenter, Flex System or iDataPlex blade nodes, or another rack-mounted servers with processor choices between x86-based (Intel Xeon and AMD Opteron) or uncommon Power-based processors options (only for blade servers), along with integrated storage and switches to provide a turnkey Linux or Microsoft cluster environment. These platform also supports the water-cooling module options (Heat Exchange Doors) for some rack towers designs.

Operating system choices were officially limited to Enterprise Linux distributions from Red Hat and SUSE and to Microsoft Windows HPC Server 2008. For systems management IBM offered xCAT. Additional software, such as GPFS and LoadLeveler, could also be ordered from IBM.

== See also ==
- IBM BladeCenter and IBM Flex System
- iDataPlex
