= IBM System p =

High-end line of RISC (POWER)/UNIX-based servers

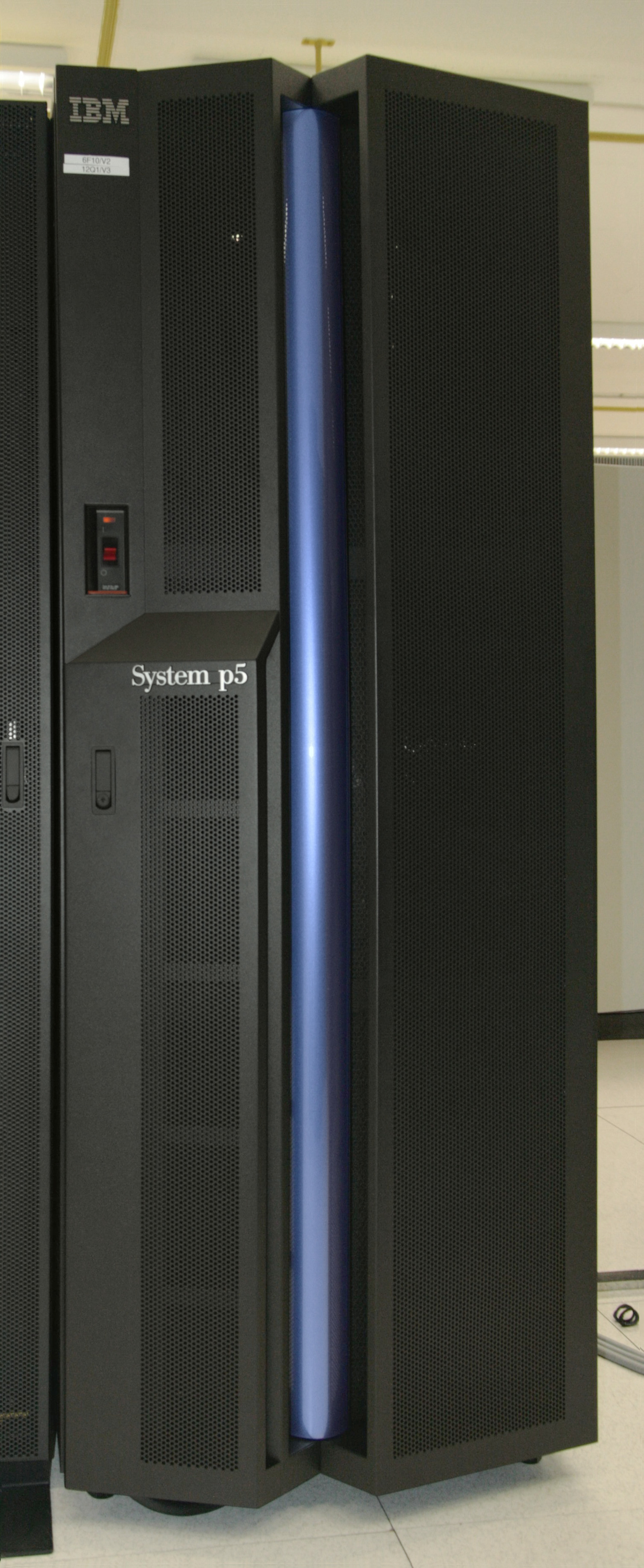
- System p5 595
- Also known as: eServer pSeries (2000-2004) eServer p5 (2004-2005) System p5 (2005-2007) System p (2007-2008)
- Developer: IBM
- Type: Server
- Released: 2000
- Discontinued: April 2008
- CPU: IBM Power or PowerPC
- Predecessor: IBM RS/6000
- Successor: IBM Power Systems
- Related: IBM System i

The IBM System p is a high-end line of RISC (Power)/UNIX-based servers. It was the successor of the RS/6000 line, and predecessor of the IBM Power Systems server series.

== History ==
The previous RS/6000 line was originally a line of workstations and servers. The first System p server line was named the eServer pSeries in 2000 as part of the e-Server branding initiative.

In 2004, with the advent of the POWER5 processor, the server family was rebranded the eServer p5.

In 2005, following IBM's move to streamline its server and storage brands worldwide, and incorporating the "System" brand with the Systems Agenda, the family was again renamed to System p5. The System p5 now encompassed the IBM OpenPower product line.

In 2007, after the introduction of the POWER6 processor models, the last rename under the System p brand dropped the p (numbered) designation.

In April 2008, IBM announced a rebranding of the System p and its unification with the mid-range System i platform. The resulting product line was called IBM Power Systems.

== Hardware and software ==
=== Processors ===
Whereas the previous RS/6000 line used a mix of early POWER and PowerPC processors, when pSeries came along, this had evolved into RS64-III and POWER3 across the board—POWER3 for its excellent floating-point performance and RS64 for its scalability, throughput, and integer performance.

IBM developed the POWER4 processor to replace both POWER3 and the RS64 line in 2001. After that, the differences between throughput and number crunching-optimized systems no longer existed. Since then, System p machines evolved to use the POWER5 but also the PowerPC 970 for the low-end and blade systems.

The last System p systems used the POWER6 processor, such as the POWER6-based System p 570 and the JS22 blade. In addition, during the SuperComputing 2007 (SC07) conference in Reno, IBM introduced a new POWER6-based System p 575 with 32 POWER6 cores at 4.7 GHz and up to 256 GB of RAM with water cooling.

=== Features ===
All IBM System p5 and IBM eServer p5 machines support DLPAR (Dynamic Logical Partitioning) with Virtual I/O and Micro-partitioning.

System p generally uses the AIX operating system and, more recently, 64-bit versions of the Linux operating system.

== Models ==
=== BladeCenter ===
- IBM BladeCenter JS12 (POWER6)
- IBM BladeCenter JS22 (POWER6)
- IBM BladeCenter JS23 (POWER6)
- IBM BladeCenter JS43 (POWER6)

=== Main line ===
==== eServer pSeries ====
- IBM eServer pSeries 610 (7028-6C1 & 6E1)
- IBM eServer pSeries 615 (7029-6C3, 7029-6E3) (1~2-core POWER4+ CPU)
- IBM eServer pSeries 620 (7025-F80, 6F0 & 6F1) (1~3 2-core RS64-IV CPUs)
- IBM eServer pSeries 630 (7028-6C4, 7028-6E4) (1 1-core POWER4 CPU or 1~2 2-core POWER4 CPUs)
- IBM eServer pSeries 640 (7026-B80) 1-4 POWER3-II CPUs
- IBM eServer pSeries 650 (7038-6M2) 2-8 POWER4 CPUs
- IBM eServer pSeries 655 (7039-651) 4-8 POWER4 CPUs
- IBM eServer pSeries 660 (7026-H80, 6H0, 6H1, M80 & 6M1)
- IBM eServer pSeries 670 (7040-671) 4-16 POWER4 CPUs
- IBM eServer pSeries 680 (7017 range)
- IBM eServer pSeries 690 (7040-681) 8-32 POWER4 CPUs

The IBM p690 was, at the time of its release in late 2001, the flagship of IBM's high-end Unix servers during the POWER4 era of processors. It was built to run IBM AIX Unix, although it is possible to run a version of Linux minus some POWER4-specific features.

It could support up to 32 (1.5, 1.7 or 1.9 GHz) POWER4+ processors and 1 TB of RAM, which weighs well over 1000 kg. It was used in a supercomputer at Forschungszentrum Jülich in 2004, and was discontinued in late 2005.

==== eServer p5 ====
Released in 2004.

- IBM eServer p5 510 Express (9111-510) (1~2-core 1.5 GHz POWER5 CPU)
- IBM eServer p5 510 (9111-510) (1~2-core 1.65 GHz POWER5 CPU)
- IBM eServer p5 520 Express (9111-520) (1~2-core 1.5 GHz POWER5 CPU)
- IBM eServer p5 520 (9111-520) (2-core 1.65 GHz POWER5 CPU)
- IBM eServer p5 550 Express (9113-550) (1~2 1~2-core 1.5 GHz POWER5 CPUs)
- IBM eServer p5 550 (9113-550) (1~2 2-core 1.65 GHz POWER5 CPUs)
- IBM eServer p5 570 Express (9117-570) (1~8 2-core 1.5 GHz POWER5 CPUs)
- IBM eServer p5 570 (9117-570) (1~8 2-core 1.65 GHz or 1.9 GHz POWER5 CPUs)
- IBM eServer p5 590 (9119-590) (1~4 8-core 1.65 GHz POWER5 MCMs)
- IBM eServer p5 595 (9119-595) (2, 4, 6 or 8 8-core 1.65 GHz or 1.9 GHz POWER5 MCMs)

==== System p5 ====
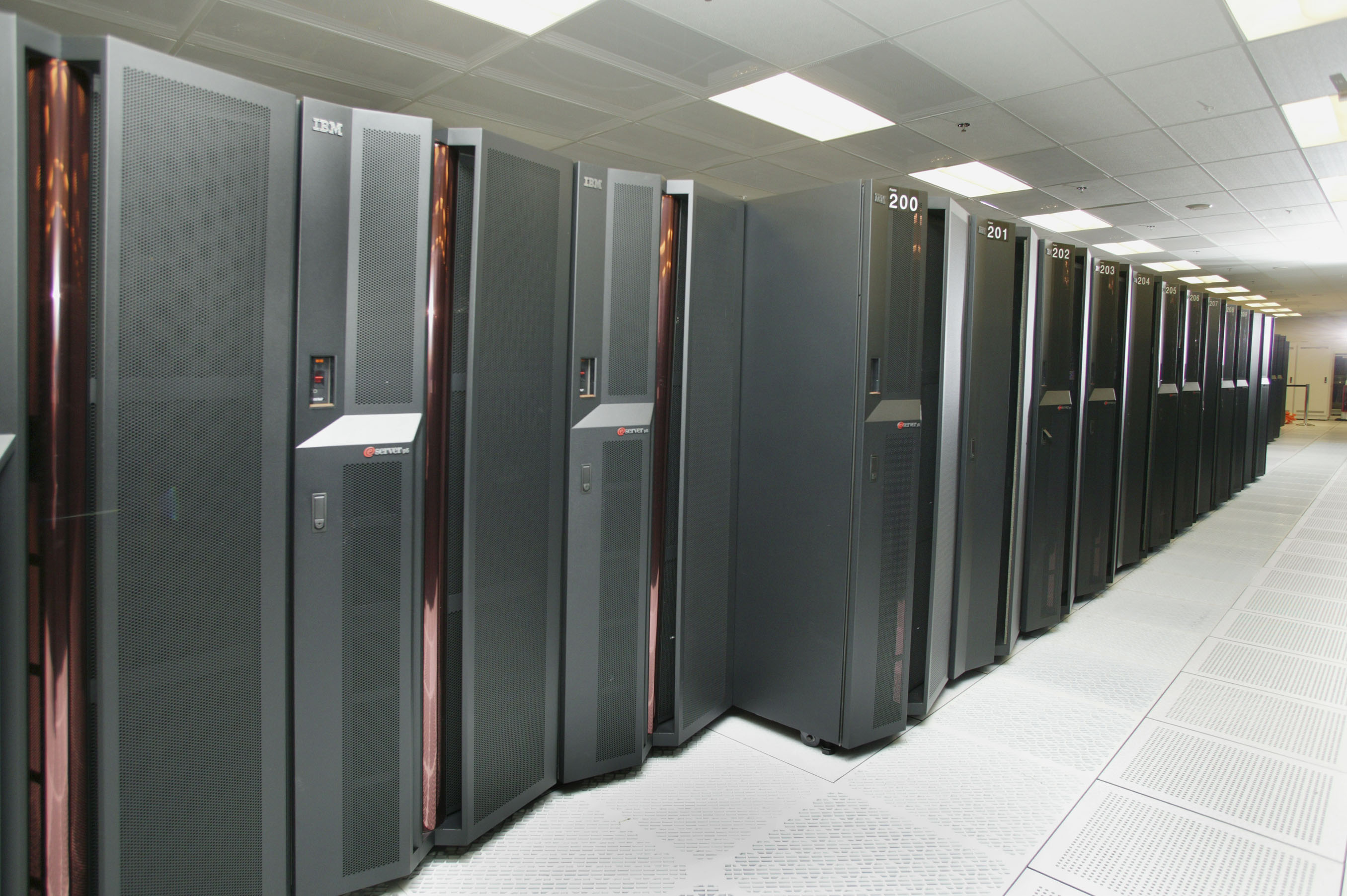
ASC Purple Supercomputer

- IBM System p5 185 (7037-A50) (1~2-core PowerPC 970 CPU)
- IBM System p5 505 (9115-505) (1~2-core POWER5 or POWER5+ CPU)
- IBM System p5 505Q (9115-505) (4-core POWER5+ CPU)
- IBM System p5 510 (9110-51A) (1~2 1~2-core POWER5 or POWER5+ CPUs)
- IBM System p5 510Q (9110-51A) (1~2 4-core POWER5+ CPUs)
- IBM System p5 520 (9131-52A) (1~2-core POWER5+ CPU)
- IBM System p5 520Q (9131-52A) (4-core POWER5+ CPU)
- IBM System p5 550 (9133-55A) (1~2 2-core POWER5+ CPUs)
- IBM System p5 550Q (9133-55A) (1~2 4-core POWER5+ CPUs)
- IBM System p5 560Q (9116-561) (1, 2 or 4 4-core POWER5+ CPUs)
- IBM System p5 570 (9117-570) (1~8 2-core POWER5+ CPUs)
- IBM System p5 575 (9118-575) (8 1~2-core POWER5+ CPUs)
- IBM System p5 590 (9119-590) (1~2 16-core POWER5 or POWER5+ processor books)
- IBM System p5 595 (9119-595) (1~4 16-core POWER5 or POWER5+ processor books)

==== System p ====
- IBM System p 520 Express (1, 2 or 4-core POWER6 CPU)
- IBM System p 550 Express (1~4 2-core POWER6 CPUs)
- IBM System p 560 Express (POWER6)
- IBM System p 570 (POWER6)
- IBM System p 575 (POWER6)
- IBM System p 595 (9119-FHA) (1~8 8-core POWER6 processor books)

System p was rebranded to Power Systems in 2008.

=== OpenPower ===
OpenPower was the name of a range of servers in the System p line from IBM. They featured IBM's POWER5 CPUs and run only 64-bit versions of Linux. IBM's own UNIX variant, AIX is not supported since the OpenPower servers are not licensed for this operating system.

There were two models available, with a variety of configurations.

Before 2005, OpenPower belonged to the eServer product line but were eventually rolled into the IBM's Power Systems product portfolio.

- IBM eServer OpenPower 710 (9123-710) (1~2-core POWER5 CPU)
- IBM eServer OpenPower 720 (9124-720) 1-4 POWER5 CPUs

=== IntelliStation POWER ===
- IBM IntelliStation POWER 265
- IBM IntelliStation POWER 275
- IBM IntelliStation POWER 185 (PowerPC 970)
- IBM IntelliStation POWER 285

=== BladeCenter ===
- IBM BladeCenter JS20 (PowerPC 970)
- IBM BladeCenter JS21 (PowerPC 970)

== See also ==
- Web-based System Manager, an AIX management software
- IBM Hardware Management Console, a management appliance
- Dynamic Logical Partitioning
- Linux on Power
- IBM IntelliStation POWER
- PureSystems
- List of IBM products

Preceded by IBM RS/6000	IBM System p 2000 - 2008: eServer pSeries; 2000 / eServer p5 2004 / System p5 2005 / System p 2007	Succeeded by IBM Power Systems
Preceded by IBM AS/400	IBM System i 2000 - 2008: eServer iSeries; 2000 / eServer i5 2004 / System i5 2005 / System i 2006	Succeeded by IBM Power Systems
