= IBM Power Systems =

Line of computer servers from IBM

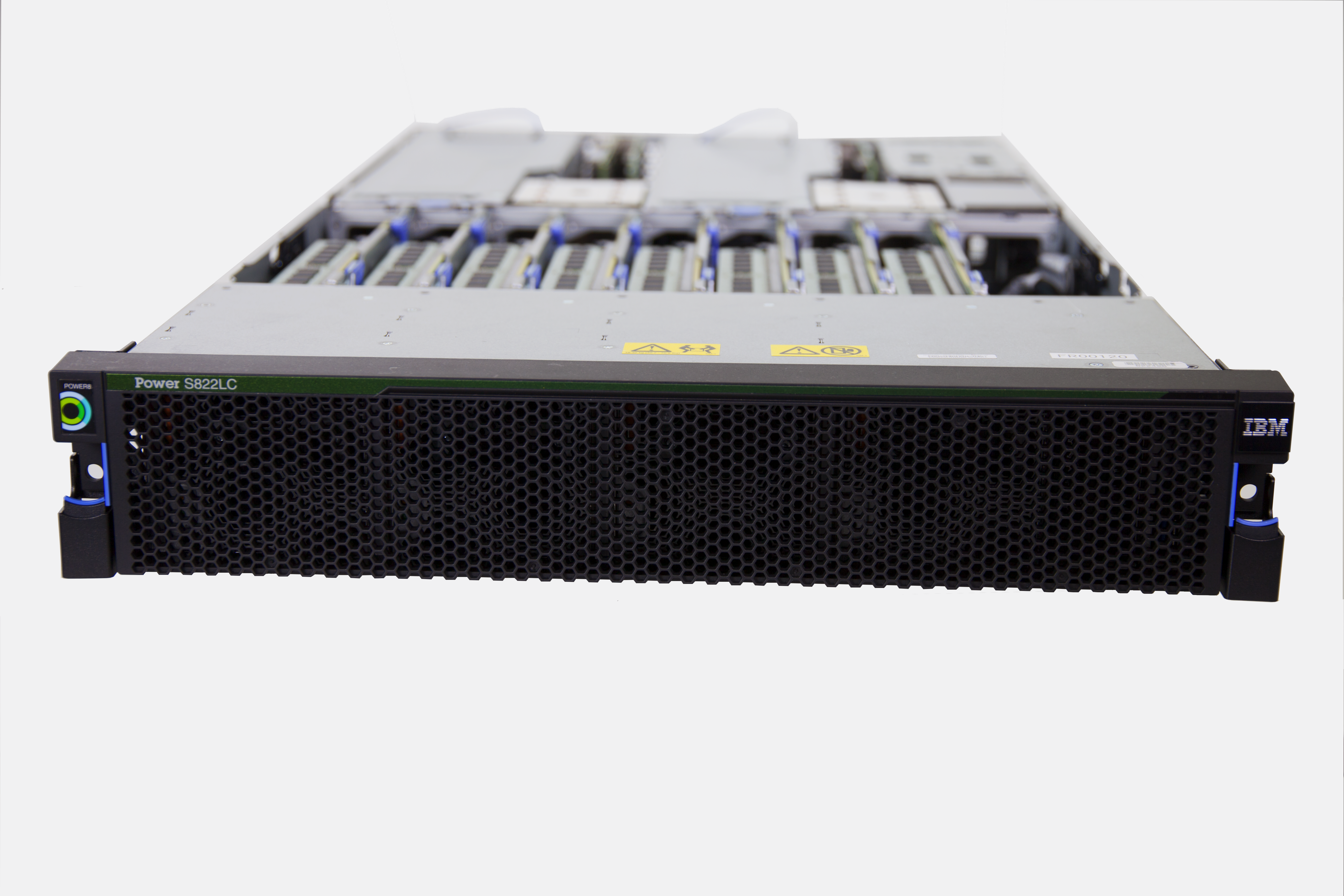
- IBM Power S822LC
- Also known as: IBM Power (2008–2009)
- Manufacturer: International Business Machines Corporation (IBM)
- Released: April 2, 2008; 18 years ago
- Operating system: AIX, IBM i, Linux on Power
- CPU: IBM Power
- Predecessor: IBM System i, IBM System p
- Website: ibm.com/power

IBM Power Systems is a family of server computers from IBM that are based on its Power processors. It was created in 2008 as a merger of the System p and System i product lines.

== History ==
IBM had two distinct POWER- and PowerPC-based hardware lines since the early 1990s:

- Servers running processors based on the IBM PowerPC-AS architecture in the AS/400 family (later known as iSeries, then System i) running OS/400 (later known as i5/OS, and now IBM i)
- Servers and workstations using POWER and PowerPC processors in the RS/6000 family (later known as pSeries, then System p), running IBM AIX and Linux on Power.

After the introduction of the POWER4 processor in 2001, there was little difference between both the "p" and the "i" hardware; the only differences were in the software and services offerings. With the introduction of the POWER5 processor in 2004, even the product numbering was synchronized. The System i5 570 was virtually identical to the System p5 570.

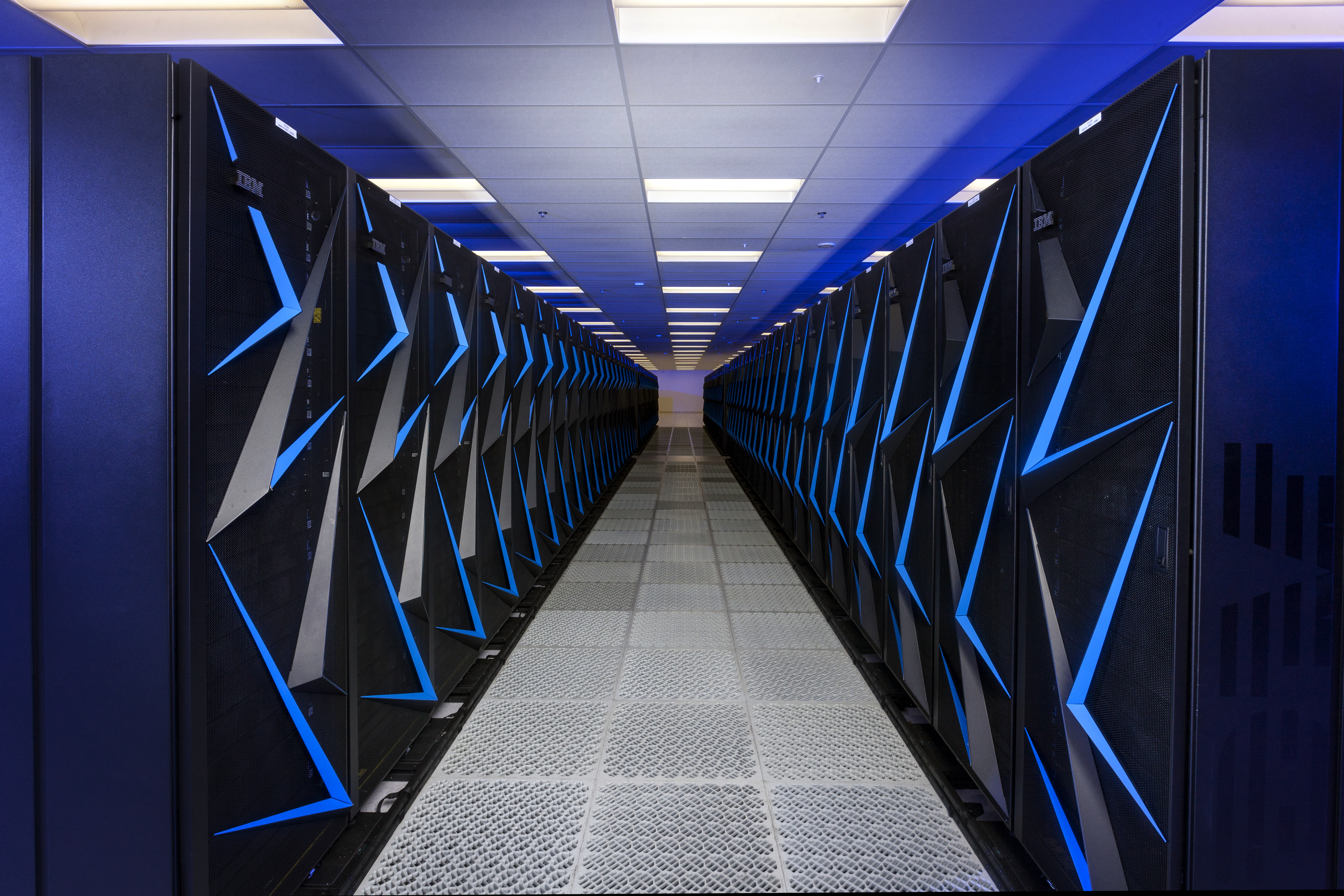
2018 Sierra supercomputer, based on Power System nodes

In April 2008, IBM officially merged the two lines of servers and workstations under the same name, Power, and later Power Systems, with identical hardware and a choice of operating systems, software, and service contracts, based formerly on a POWER6 architecture. The PowerPC line was discontinued.

With Release 8 of Red Hat Enterprise Linux, IBM has completed transition of POWER8 and POWER9 servers to little-endian mode for Linux. AIX and IBM i continue to run in big-endian mode.

== Systems ==
IBM Power Systems models:

- 2008/2009
  - BladeCenter JS12 Express
  - BladeCenter JS22 Express
  - BladeCenter JS23 Express
  - BladeCenter JS43 Express
  - Power 520 Express
  - Power 550 Express
  - Power 560 Express
  - Power 570
  - Power 575
  - Power 595
- 2010
  - BladeCenter PS700 Express
  - BladeCenter PS701 Express
  - BladeCenter PS702 Express
  - Power 710/730 Express (8231-E2B) (1~2 4, 6 or 8-core POWER7 CPUs)
  - Power 720 Express (8202-E4B) (4, 6 or 8-core POWER7 CPU)
  - Power 740 Express (8205-E6B) (1~2 4, 6 or 8-core POWER7 CPUs)
  - Power 750 Express (8233-E8B) (1~4 6 or 8-core POWER7 CPUs)
  - Power 755 (8236-E8C) (4 8-core POWER7 CPUs) – for high-performance computing (HPC)
  - Power 770
  - Power 780
  - Power 795
- 2011
  - Power 710 Express (8231-E1C) (4, 6 or 8-core POWER7 CPU)
  - Power 720 Express (8202-E4C) (4, 6 or 8-core POWER7 CPU)
  - Power 730 Express (8231-E2C) (2 4, 6 or 8-core POWER7 CPUs)
  - Power 740 Express (8205-E6C) (1~2 4, 6 or 8-core POWER7 CPUs)
  - Power 775 – also known as PERCS
- 2012
  - Flex System p260
  - Flex System p460
  - Flex System p24L (Linux only)
- 2013
  - Power 710 Express (8231-E1D) (4, 6 or 8-core POWER7+ CPU)
  - Power 720 Express (8202-E4D) (4, 6 or 8-core POWER7+ CPU)
  - Power 730 Express (8231-E2D) (2 6 or 8-core POWER7+ CPUs)
  - Power 740 Express (8205-E6D) (1~2 6 or 8-core POWER7+ CPUs)
  - Power 750 Express (8408-E8D) (1~4 8-core POWER7+ DCMs)
  - Power 760 (9109-RMD) (1~4 12-core POWER7+ DCMs)
- 2014
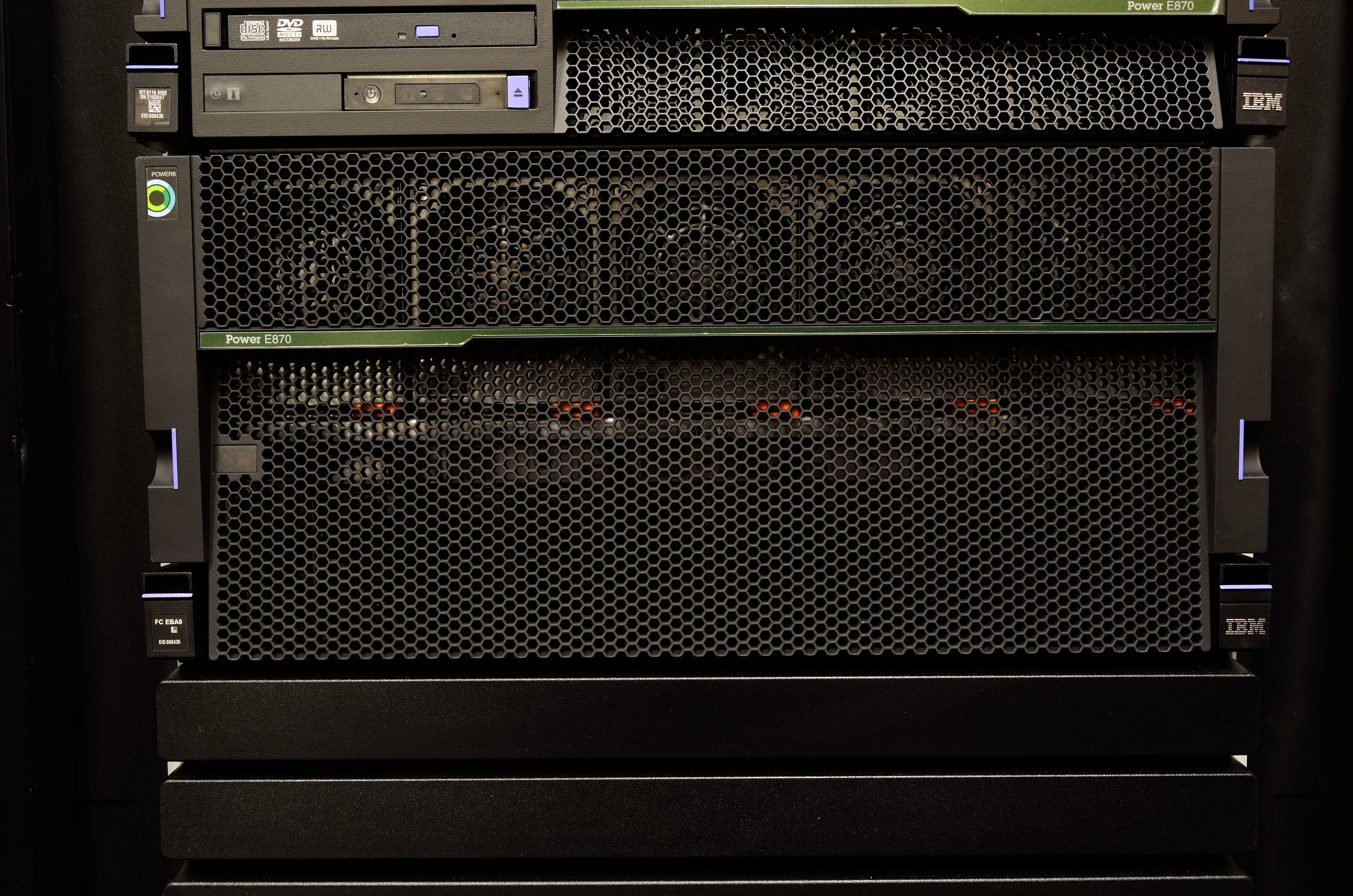
  POWER8-based IBM Power Systems E870 can be configured with up to 80 processor cores and 8 TB of memory.
  - Power Systems S821LC and S821LC
  - Power Systems S822 and S822L
  - Power Systems S814
  - Power Systems S824 and S824L
  - Power Systems E870
  - Power Systems E880
- 2015
  - Power Systems E850
  - Power Systems S812L and S812LC
  - Power Systems S822LC
- 2017
  - Power Systems AC922
  - Power Systems LC922
  - Power Systems IC922
  - Power Systems L922
  - Power Systems S914
  - Power Systems S922
  - Power Systems S924
  - Power Systems H922
  - Power Systems H924
  - Power Systems E950
  - Power Systems E980
- 2021
  - Power E1080
- 2022
  - Power S1014
  - Power S1022s
  - Power S1022
  - Power S1024
- 2022
  - Power E1050
- 2024
  - Power S1012
- 2025
  - Power S1122
  - Power L1122
  - Power S1124
  - Power L1124
  - Power E1150
  - Power E1180
- 2026
  - Power S1112

IBM PowerVM provides the virtualisation solution for Power Systems servers.

== See also ==
- IBM BladeCenter
- PureSystems

| Preceded by IBM System i | IBM Power Systems; 2008 - current |
| Preceded by IBM System p | IBM Power Systems; 2008 - current |
