= IBM RS/6000 SP =

Series of supercomputers by IBM

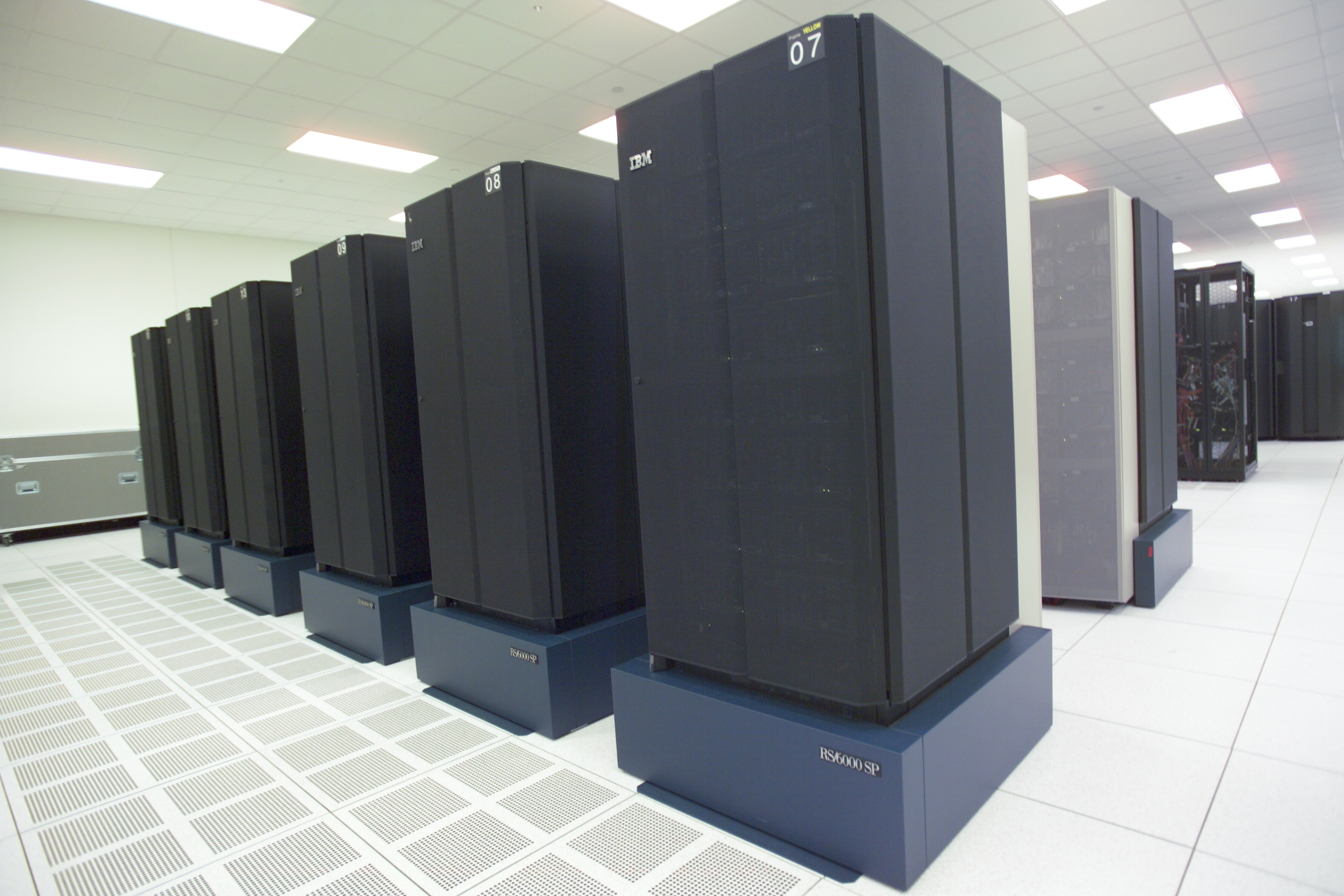
- Developer: IBM
- Type: Supercomputer platform
- Released: February 1993
- Discontinued: October 2000
- CPU: IBM POWER; PowerPC
- Successor: IBM Blue Gene
- Website: rs6000.ibm.com at the Wayback Machine (archived 2000-08-16)

The Scalable POWERparallel (SP) is a discontinued series of supercomputers in the RS/6000 line by IBM. The first model, the SP1, was introduced in February 1993, and new models were introduced throughout the 1990s until the RS/6000 was succeeded by eServer pSeries in October 2000. The SP is a distributed memory system, consisting of multiple RS/6000-based nodes interconnected by an IBM-proprietary switch called the High Performance Switch (HPS). The nodes are clustered using software called PSSP, which is mainly written in Perl.

Computer scientist Marc Snir was awarded the Seymour Cray Computer Engineering Award by the Institute of Electrical and Electronics Engineers in 2013 for his contributions to supercomputing, which included his work on the SP.

== Models ==
List of models
Model	# of CPUs	CPU	CPU MHz	Memory	Introduced	Discontinued
SP1	1	POWER1++	62.5	64 to 256 MB	1993-02-02	1994-12-16
Thin Node	1	POWER2	66	64 to 512 MB	1994-04-06	1996-07-26
Thin Node 2	1	POWER2	66	64 to 512 MB	1995-02-07	1997-06-27
Wide Node	1	POWER2	66	64 MB to 2 GB	1994-04-06	1996-07-26
77 MHz Wide Node	1	POWER2	77	64 MB to 2 GB	1995-08-22	1997-06-27
High 1	2, 4, 6, 8	PowerPC 604	112	?	1996-07-23	1998-01-08
High 2	2, 4, 6, 8	PowerPC 604e	200	?	1997-08-26	1998-04-21
332 Thin	2, 4	PowerPC 604e	332	?	1998-04-21	2000-12-29
332 Wide	2, 4	PowerPC 604e	332	?	1998-04-21	2000-12-29
160 Thin	1	P2SC	160	?	1997-10-06	1998-04-21
Thin P2SC	1	P2SC	120	?	1996-10-08	1998-04-21
Wide P2SC	1	P2SC	135	?	1996-10-08	1998-04-21
POWER3 High	2, 4, 6, 8	POWER3	222	?	1999-09-13	2000-12-29
POWER3 High	2, 4, 6, 8	POWER3-II	375	?	2000-07-18	2002-12-27
POWER3 Thin	1, 2	POWER3	200	?	1999-09-01	2000-06-30
POWER3 Thin	1, 2	POWER3-II	375	?	2000-02-07	2003-04-08
POWER3 Thin	1, 2	POWER3-II	450	?	2002-01-22	2003-04-08
POWER3 Wide	1, 2	POWER3	200	?	1999-02-01	2000-06-30
POWER3 Wide	2, 4	POWER3-II	375	?	2000-02-07	2003-04-08
POWER3 Wide	2, 4	POWER3-II	450	?	2002-01-22	2003-04-08

== Deployments ==
- The Cornell Theory Center had a 512-node system that was ranked as the sixth fastest supercomputer in the world by the November 1995 edition of the Top500 List. From a peak performance of 136.19 GFLOPS, it obtained 88.40 GFLOPS on the LINPACK benchmark.
- Deep Blue, the first computer to win a chess game against a reigning world champion in a match with Garry Kasparov in 1996.
- ASCI Blue Pacific is a PowerPC 604-based system with a peak performance of 3.9 TFLOPS. It was installed at the Lawrence Livermore National Laboratory (LLNL) in 1998 as part of the Advanced Strategic Computing Initiative (ASCI).
- ASCI White is a 512-node system with a peak performance of 12.3 TFLOPS. It was installed at the LLNL in 2001 as part of ASCI, and was ranked #1 in the Top500 List from November 2000 to November 2001.
- Seaborg, at the Lawrence Berkeley National Laboratory, was ranked as the fifth fastest supercomputer in the world when it debuted in the June 2003 edition of the Top500 List. From a peak performance of 9.98 TFLOPS, it obtained 7.30 TFLOPS on the LINPACK benchmark.

== See also ==
- Blue Gene
