= IBM Power microprocessors =

Series of microprocessors from IBM

Power microprocessors (originally POWER prior to Power10) are designed and sold by IBM for servers and supercomputers. The name "POWER" was originally presented as an acronym for "Performance Optimization With Enhanced RISC". The Power line of microprocessors has been used in IBM's RS/6000, AS/400, pSeries, iSeries, System p, System i, and Power Systems lines of servers and supercomputers. They have also been used in data storage devices and workstations by IBM and by other server manufacturers like Bull and Hitachi.

The Power family was originally developed in the late 1980s, and remains under active development. In the beginning, they implemented the POWER instruction set architecture (ISA), which evolved into PowerPC and later into Power ISA. In August 2019, IBM announced it would open source the Power ISA. As part of the move, it was also announced that administration of the OpenPOWER Foundation is handled by the Linux Foundation.

== History ==
=== Early developments ===
==== The 801 research project ====
In 1974, IBM started a project to build a telephone switching computer that required immense computational power. Since the application was comparably simple, this machine would need only to perform I/O, branches, add register-register, move data between registers and memory, and would have no need for special instructions to perform heavy arithmetic. This simple design philosophy, whereby each step of a complex operation is specified explicitly by one machine instruction, and all instructions are required to complete in the same constant time, was later called RISC. When the telephone switch project was canceled, IBM retained the design for the general purpose processor and named it 801 after building #801 at Thomas J. Watson Research Center.

==== The Cheetah project ====
By 1982, IBM continued to explore the superscalar limits of the 801 design by using multiple execution units to improve performance to determine if a RISC machine could maintain multiple instructions per cycle. Many changes were made to the 801 design to allow for multiple execution units and the Cheetah processor has separate units for branch prediction, fixed-point, and floating-point execution. By 1984, CMOS was chosen because it allows improved circuit integration and transistor-logic performance.

==== The America project ====
In 1985, research on a second-generation RISC architecture started at the IBM Thomas J. Watson Research Center, producing the "AMERICA architecture". In 1986, IBM Austin started developing the RS/6000 series computers based on that architecture. This was to become the first POWER processors using the first POWER ISA.

=== POWER ===
This schematic shows the evolution of the different POWER, PowerPC, and Power ISAs.

The first IBM computers to incorporate the POWER ISA are the RISC System/6000 or RS/6000 series. They were released in February 1990. These RS/6000 computers were divided into two classes, POWERstation workstations and POWERserver servers. The first RS/6000 CPU has 2 configurations, called the "RIOS-1" and "RIOS.9" (or more commonly the POWER1 CPU). A RIOS-1 configuration has a total of 10 discrete chips: an instruction cache chip, fixed-point chip, floating-point chip, 4 data L1 cache chips, storage control chip, input/output chips, and a clock chip. The lower cost RIOS.9 configuration has 8 discrete chips: an instruction cache chip, fixed-point chip, floating-point chip, 2 data cache chips, storage control chip, input/output chip, and a clock chip.

The POWER1 is the first microprocessor to have used register renaming and out-of-order execution. A simplified and less powerful version of the 10 chip RIOS-1 was made in 1992, for lower-end RS/6000s. It uses only one chip and is called RISC Single Chip or RSC.

==== POWER1 processors ====
- RIOS-1 – the original 10-chip version
- RIOS.9 – a less powerful version of RIOS-1
- POWER1+ – a faster version of RIOS-1 made on a reduced fabrication process
- POWER1++ – an even faster version of RIOS-1
- RSC – a single-chip implementation of RIOS-1
- RAD6000 – a radiation-hardened version of the RSC was released primarily for use in space; it was a very popular design and was used extensively on many high-profile missions

=== POWER2 ===
IBM started the POWER2 processor effort as a successor to the POWER1. By adding a second fixed-point unit, a second powerful floating point unit, and other performance enhancements and new instructions to the design, the POWER2 ISA had leadership performance when it was announced in November 1993. The POWER2 was a multi-chip design, but IBM also made a single chip design of it, called the POWER2 Super Chip or P2SC that went into high performance servers and supercomputers. At the time of its introduction in 1996, the P2SC was the largest processor with the highest transistor count in the industry and was a leader in floating point operations.

==== POWER2 processors ====
- POWER2 – 6 to 8 chips were mounted on a ceramic multi chip module
- POWER2+ – a cheaper 6-chip version of POWER2 with support for external L2 caches
- P2SC – a faster and single chip version of POWER2
- P2SC+ – an even faster version or P2SC due to reduced fabrication process

=== PowerPC ===
In 1991, Apple researched a future alternative to the CISC-based Motorola 68000 series platform, and Motorola experimented with a RISC platform of its own, the 88000. IBM joined the discussion and the three founded the AIM alliance to build the PowerPC ISA, heavily based on the POWER ISA, but with additions from both Apple and Motorola. It was to be a complete 32/64 bit RISC architecture, and to range from very low end embedded microcontrollers to the very high end supercomputer and server applications.

After two years of development, the resulting PowerPC ISA was introduced in 1993. A modified version of the RSC architecture, PowerPC added single-precision floating point instructions and general register-to-register multiply and divide instructions, and removed some POWER features. It also added a 64-bit version of the ISA and support for SMP.

=== The Amazon project ===
In 1990, IBM wanted to merge the low end server and mid range server architectures, the RS/6000 RISC ISA and AS/400 CISC ISA into one common RISC ISA that could host both IBM's AIX and OS/400 operating systems. The existing POWER and the upcoming PowerPC ISAs were deemed unsuitable by the AS/400 team so an extension to the 64-bit PowerPC instruction set was developed called PowerPC AS for Advanced Series or Amazon Series. Later, additions from the RS/6000 team and AIM Alliance PowerPC were included, and by 2001, with the introduction of POWER4, they were all joined into one instruction set architecture: the PowerPC v.2.0.

=== POWER3 ===
The POWER3 began as PowerPC 630, a successor of the commercially unsuccessful PowerPC 620. It uses a combination of the POWER2 ISA and the 32/64-bit PowerPC ISA set with support for SMP and single-chip implementation. It was used to great extent in IBM's RS/6000 computers, and the second generation version, the POWER3-II, is the first commercially available processor from IBM using copper interconnects. The POWER3 is the last processor to use a POWER instruction set, and all subsequent models use the PowerPC instruction sets.

==== POWER3 processors ====
- POWER3 – Introduced in 1998, it combined the POWER and PowerPC instruction sets.
- POWER3-II – A faster POWER3 fabricated on a reduced size, copper based process.

=== POWER4 ===
The POWER4 merged the 32/64 bit PowerPC instruction set and the 64-bit PowerPC AS instruction set from the Amazon project to the new PowerPC v.2.0 specification, unifying IBM's RS/6000 and AS/400 families of computers. Besides the unification of the different platforms, POWER4 was also designed to reach very high frequencies and have large on-die L2 caches. It is the first commercially available multi-core processor, and came in single-die versions and in four-chip multi-chip modules. In 2002, IBM also made a cost- and feature-reduced version of the POWER4 called PowerPC 970 by Apple's request.

==== POWER4 processors ====
- POWER4 – The first dual core microprocessor and the first PowerPC processor to reach beyond 1 GHz.
- POWER4+ – A faster POWER4 fabricated on a reduced process.

=== POWER5 ===
The POWER5 processors built on the popular POWER4 and incorporated simultaneous multithreading into the design, a technology pioneered in the PowerPC AS based RS64-III processor, and on-die memory controllers. It was designed for multiprocessing on a massive scale and came in multi-chip modules with onboard large L3 cache chips.

==== POWER5 processors ====
- POWER5 – The iconic setup with four POWER5 chips and four L3 cache chips on a large multi-chip module.
- POWER5+ – A faster POWER5 fabricated on a reduced process mainly to reduce power consumption.

=== Power ISA ===
A joint organization was founded in 2004 called Power.org with the mission to unify and coordinate future development of the PowerPC specifications. By then, the PowerPC specification was fragmented since Freescale (née Motorola) and IBM had taken different paths in their respective development of it. Freescale had prioritized 32-bit embedded applications and IBM high-end servers and supercomputers. There was also a collection of licensees of the specification like AMCC, Synopsys, Sony, Microsoft, P.A. Semi, CRAY, and Xilinx that needed coordination. The joint effort was not only to streamline development of the technology but also to streamline marketing.

The new instruction set architecture was called Power ISA and merged the PowerPC v.2.02 from the POWER5 with the PowerPC Book E specification from Freescale as well as some related technologies like the Vector-Media Extensions known under the brand name AltiVec (also called VMX by IBM) and hardware virtualization. This new ISA was called 'Power ISA v.2.03 and POWER6 was the first high end processor from IBM to use it. Older POWER and PowerPC specifications did not make the cut and those instruction sets were henceforth deprecated for good. There is no active development on any processor type today that uses these older instruction sets.

=== POWER6 ===
POWER6 is the result of the ambitious eCLipz Project, joining the I (AS/400), P (RS/6000), and Z (mainframe) instruction sets under one common platform. I and P was already joined with the POWER4, but the eCLipz effort failed to include the CISC based z/Architecture and where the z10 processor became POWER6's eCLipz sibling. As of 2021, a separate line of processors implementing z/Architecture continue to be developed by IBM, with the latest being the IBM Telum.

Because of eCLipz, the POWER6 is an unusual design for very high frequencies and sacrificing out-of-order execution, a feature since the inception of POWER and PowerPC processors. POWER6 also introduced the decimal floating point unit to the Power ISA, which it shares with z/Architecture.

With the POWER6, in 2008 IBM merged the former System p and System i server and workstation families into one family called Power Systems. Power Systems machines can run different operating systems like AIX, Linux, and IBM i.

==== POWER6 processors ====
- POWER6 – Reached 5 GHz; comes in modules with a single chip on it, and in MCM with two L3 cache chips.
- POWER6+ – A minor update, fabricated on the same process as POWER6.

=== POWER7 ===
The POWER7 symmetric multiprocessor design was a substantial evolution from the POWER6 design, focusing more on power efficiency through multiple cores, simultaneous multithreading (SMT), out-of-order execution and large on-die eDRAM L3 caches. The eight-core chip could execute 32 threads in parallel, and has a mode in which it could disable cores to reach higher frequencies for the ones that are left. It uses a new high-performance floating point unit called VSX that merges the functionality of the traditional FPU with AltiVec. Even while the POWER7 run at lower frequencies than POWER6, each POWER7 core performs faster than its POWER6 counterpart.

==== POWER7 processors ====
- POWER7 – Comes in single-chip modules or in quad-chip MCM-configurations for supercomputer applications.
- POWER7+ – Scaled down fabrication process, and increased L3 cache and frequency.

=== POWER8 ===
POWER8 is a 4 GHz, 12 core processor with 8 hardware threads per core for a total of 96 threads of parallel execution. It uses 96 MB of eDRAM L3 cache on chip and 128 MB off-chip L4 cache and a new extension bus called CAPI that runs on top of PCIe, replacing the older GX bus. The CAPI bus can be used to attach dedicated off-chip accelerator chips such as GPUs, ASICs and FPGAs. IBM states that it is two to three times as fast as its predecessor, the POWER7.

It was first built on a 22 nanometer process in 2014. In December 2012, IBM began submitting patches to the 3.8 version of the Linux kernel, to support new POWER8 features including the VSX-2 instructions.

=== POWER9 ===
IBM spent much time designing the POWER9 processor according to William Starke, a systems architect for the POWER8 processor. The POWER9 is the first to incorporate elements of the Power ISA version 3.0 that was released in December 2015, including the VSX-3 instructions, and also incorporates support for Nvidia's NVLink bus technology.

The United States Department of Energy, Oak Ridge National Laboratory, and Lawrence Livermore National Laboratory contracted IBM and Nvidia to build two supercomputers, the Sierra and the Summit, based on POWER9 processors coupled with Nvidia's Volta GPUs. The Sierra went online in 2017 and the Summit in 2018.

POWER9 was launched in 2017, manufactured using a 14 nm FinFET process. It comes in four versions, two 24 core SMT4 versions intended to use PowerNV for scale up and scale out applications, and two 12 core SMT8 versions intended to use PowerVM for scale-up and scale-out applications. Possibly there will be more versions in the future since the POWER9 architecture is open for licensing and modification by the OpenPOWER Foundation members.

=== Power10 ===
Power10 is a CPU introduced in September 2021. It is built on a 7 nm technology.

=== Power11 ===
Power11 is a CPU introduced in July 2025.

== Devices ==
Name	Image	ISA	Bits	Cores	Fab	Transistors	Die size	L1	L2	L3	Clock	Package	Introduced
RIOS-1	—N/a	POWER	32 bits	1	1.0 μm	6.9 M	1284 mm^{2}	8 KB I 64 KB D	n/a	n/a	20–30 MHz	10 chips in CPGA on PCB	1990
RIOS.9		POWER	32 bits	1	1.0 μm	6.9 M	?	8 KB I 32 KB D	n/a	n/a	20–30 MHz	8 chips in CPGA on PCB	1990
POWER1+	—N/a	POWER	32 bits	1	?	6.9 M	?	8 KB I 64 KB D	n/a	n/a	25–41.6 MHz	8 chips in CPGA on PCB	1991
POWER1++	—N/a	POWER	32 bits	1	?	6.9 M	?	8 KB I 64 KB D	n/a	n/a	25–62.5 MHz	8 chips in CPGA on PCB	1992
RSC		POWER	32 bits	1	0.8 μm	1 M	226.5 mm^{2}	8 KB unified	n/a	n/a	33–45 MHz	201 pin CPGA	1992
POWER2		POWER2	32 bits	1	0.72 μm	23 M	1042.5 mm^{2} 819 mm^{2}	32 KB I 128–265 KB D	n/a	n/a	55–71.5 MHz	6–8 dies on ceramic 734 pin MCM	1993
POWER2+		POWER2	32 bits	1	0.72 μm	23 M	819 mm^{2}	32 KB I 64–128 KB D	0.5–2 MB external	n/a	55–71.5 MHz	6 chips in CBGA on PCB	1994
P2SC	—N/a	POWER2	32 bits	1	0.29 μm	15 M	335 mm^{2}	32 KB I 128 KB D	n/a	n/a	120–135 MHz	CCGA	1996
P2SC+		POWER2	32 bits	1	0.25 μm	15 M	256 mm^{2}	32 KB I 128 KB D	n/a	n/a	160 MHz	CCGA	1997
RAD6000		POWER	32 bits	1	0.5 μm	1.1 M	?	8 KB unified	n/a	n/a	20–33 MHz	Rad hard	1997
POWER3		POWER2; PowerPC 1.1	64 bits	1	0.35 μm	15 M	270 mm^{2}	32 KB I 64 KB D	1–16 MB external	n/a	200–222 MHz	1088 pin CLGA	1998
POWER3-II		POWER2; PowerPC 1.1	64 bits	1	0.25 μm Cu	23 M	170 mm^{2}	32 KB I 64 KB D	1–16 MB external	n/a	333–450 MHz	1088 pin CLGA	1999
POWER4		PowerPC 2.00; PowerPC-AS	64 bits	2	180 nm	174 M	412 mm^{2}	64 KB I 32 KB D per core	1.41 MB per core	32 MB external	1–1.3 GHz	1024 pin CLGA ceramic MCM	2001
POWER4+		PowerPC 2.01; PowerPC-AS	64 bits	2	130 nm	184 M	267 mm^{2}	64 KB I 32 KB D per core	1.41 MB per chip	32 MB external	1.2–1.9 GHz	1024 pin CLGA ceramic MCM	2002
POWER5		PowerPC 2.02; Power ISA 2.03	64 bits	2	130 nm	276 M	389 mm^{2}	32 KB I 32 KB D per core	1.875 MB per chip	32 MB external	1.5–1.9 GHz	ceramic DCM ceramic MCM	2004
POWER5+		PowerPC 2.02; Power ISA 2.03	64 bits	2	90 nm	276 M	243 mm^{2}	32 KB I 32 KB D per core	1.875 MB per chip	32 MB external	1.5–2.3 GHz	ceramic DCM ceramic QCM ceramic MCM	2005
POWER6		Power ISA 2.03	64 bits	2	65 nm	790 M	341 mm^{2}	64 KB I 64 KB D per core	4 MB per core	32 MB external	3.6–5 GHz	CLGA; OLGA	2007
POWER6+		Power ISA 2.03	64 bits	2	65 nm	790 M	341 mm^{2}	64 KB I 64 KB D per core	4 MB per core	32 MB external	3.6–5 GHz	CLGA; OLGA	2009
POWER7		Power ISA 2.06	64 bits	8	45 nm	1.2 B	567 mm^{2}	32 KB I 32 KB D per core	256 KB per core	32 MB per chip	2.4–4.25 GHz	CLGA; OLGA organic QCM	2010
POWER7+		Power ISA 2.06	64 bits	8	32 nm	2.1 B	567 mm^{2}	32 KB I 32 KB D per core	256 KB per core	80 MB per chip	2.4–4.4 GHz	OLGA organic DCM	2012
POWER8		Power ISA 2.07	64 bits	6; 12	22 nm	?? 4.2 B	362 mm^{2} 649 mm^{2}	32 KB I 64 KB D per core	512 KB per core	48 MB; 96 MB per chip	2.75–4.2 GHz	OLGA DCM; OLGA SCM	2014
POWER8 with NVLink	—N/a	Power ISA 2.07	64 bits	12	22 nm	4.2 B	659 mm^{2}	32 KB I 64 KB D per core	512 KB per core	48 MB; 96 MB per chip	3.26 GHz	OLGA SCM	2016
POWER9 SU	—N/a	Power ISA 3.0	64 bits	12; 24	14 nm	8 B	?	32 KB I 64 KB D per core	512 KB per core	120 MB per chip	~4 GHz	?	2017
Power10		Power ISA 3.1	64 bits	15; 30	7 nm	18 B	602 mm^{2}	48 KB I 32 KB D per core	2 MB per core	120 MB per chip	3.5 to 4GHz	OLGA SCM; OLGA DCM	2021
Power11	—N/a	Power ISA 3.1	64 bits	16; 30	7 nm	30 B	654 mm^{2}	96 KB I 64 KB D per core	2 MB per core	128 MB per chip	3.8 to 4.4GHz	?	2025

== See also ==
- IBM OpenPower
- OpenPOWER Foundation
