= FXU =

FXU may refer to:

- FilmXtra Uncut, a film review television show
- Fox (UK and Ireland), a European television network
- St. Francis Xavier University in Nova Scotia, Canada
- Fixed-point unit, part of the POWER1 CPU
- FXU, the student union of Falmouth University
