= Marc Snir =

Israeli computer scientist

- Education: Hebrew University of Jerusalem
- Known for: Parallel computing, Message Passing Interface, Blue Gene supercomputers
- Awards: Seymour Cray Computer Engineering Award (2013), AAAS Fellow, ACM Fellow, IEEE Fellow
- Scientific career
- Fields: Computer Science
- Workplaces: University of Illinois at Urbana-Champaign, Argonne National Laboratory, IBM T.J. Watson Research Center
- Website: snir.cs.illinois.edu

Marc Snir is an Israeli-American computer scientist, recently retired from the Siebel School of Computing and Data Science at the University of Illinois at Urbana-Champaign. He was a main author of the Message-Passing Interface standard. He participated in leading roles in the development of several major High-Performance Computing platforms, including the NYU Ultracomputer, the IBM SP1 and SP2 systems, and the IBM Blue Gene System. He received the IEEE Seymour Cray Computer Engineering Award for his contributions to High-Performance Computing. He served as Director of the Mathematics and Computer Science Division at Argonne National Laboratory from 2011 to 2016 and Head of the Computer Science Department at Illinois from 2001 to 2007.

Snir received a Ph.D. in mathematics from the Hebrew University of Jerusalem in 1979. He has published numerous papers and given many presentations on computational complexity, parallel algorithms, parallel architectures, interconnection networks, parallel languages and libraries and parallel programming environments.

Snir is an AAAS Fellow, ACM Fellow, and IEEE Fellow.
