= ASCI Blue Pacific =

ASCI Blue Pacific was a supercomputer installed at the Lawrence Livermore National Laboratory (LLNL) in Livermore, CA at the end of 1998 (28 years ago). It was a collaboration between IBM and LLNL.

It was an IBM RS/6000 SP massively parallel processing system. It contained 5,856 PowerPC 604e microprocessors. Its theoretical top performance was 3.9 teraflops.

It was built as a stage of the Accelerated Strategic Computing Initiative (ASCI) started by the U.S. Department of Energy and the National Nuclear Security Administration to build a simulator to replace live nuclear weapon testing following the moratorium on testing started by President George H. W. Bush in 1992 and extended by Bill Clinton in 1993.
