= IBM RS/6000 =

1990s line of RISC servers and workstations from IBM

IBM RISC System/6000

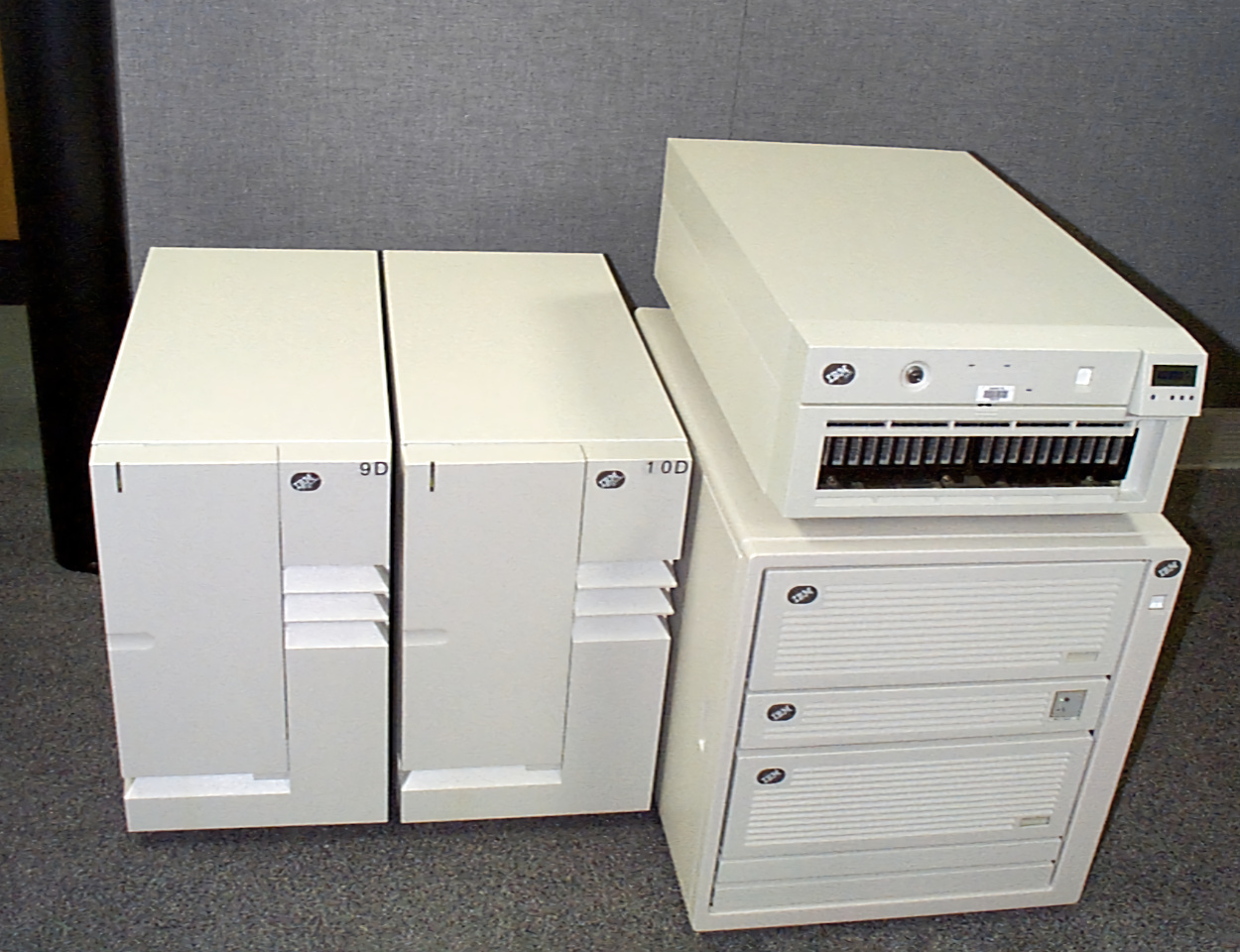
- Also known as: IBM RS/6000
- Developer: IBM
- Type: Desktop; Workstation (POWERstation); Server (POWERserver); Supercomputer platform (RS/6000 SP line)
- Released: February 1990
- Discontinued: October 2000 (servers); 2002 (workstations)
- CPU: IBM POWER; PowerPC
- Predecessor: IBM RT PC
- Successor: eServer pSeries; IntelliStation POWER; IBM ThinkPad Power Series
- Related: IBM PC Power Series
- Website: rs6000.ibm.com at the Wayback Machine (archived 2000-03-01)

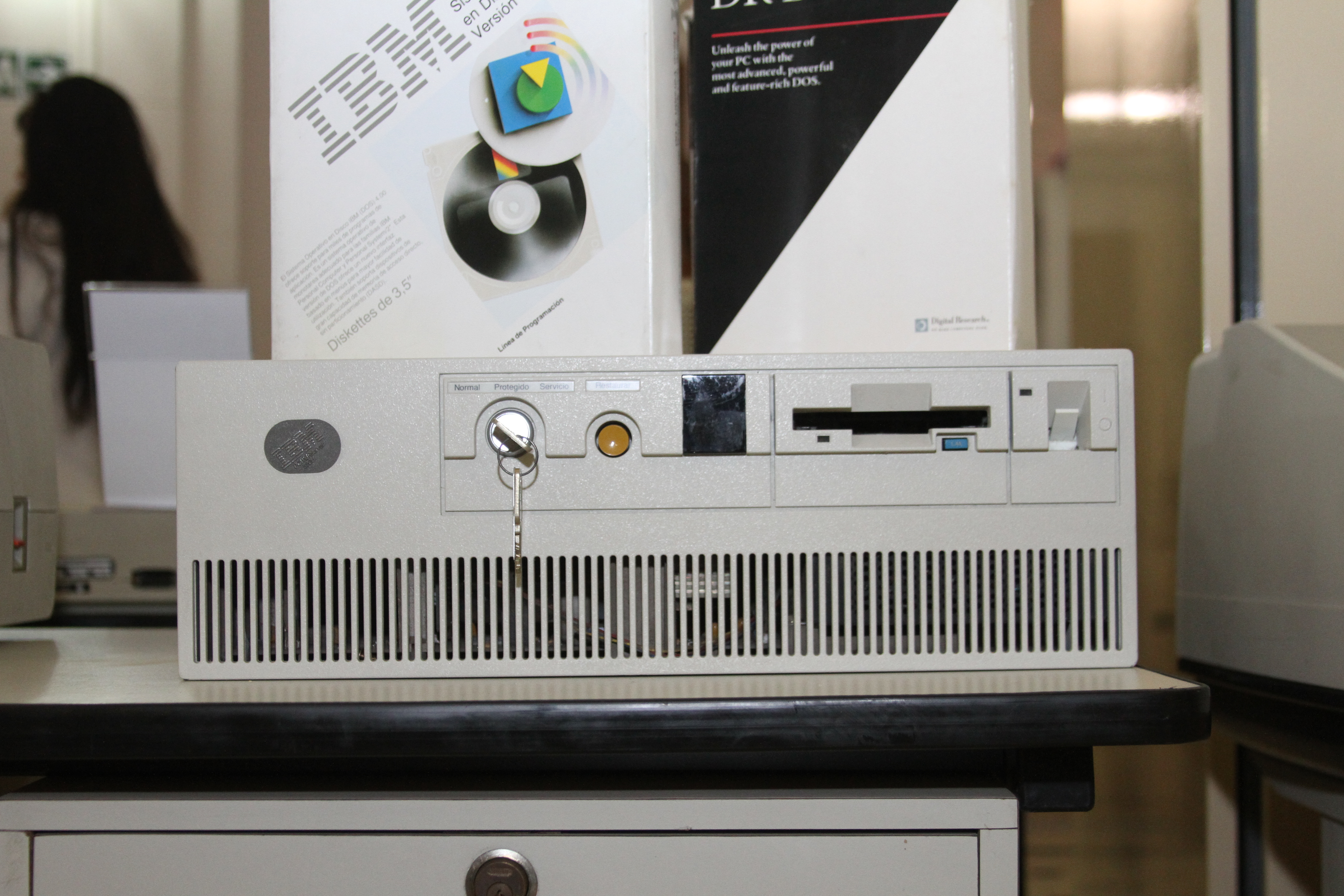
RS/6000 type 7012-320

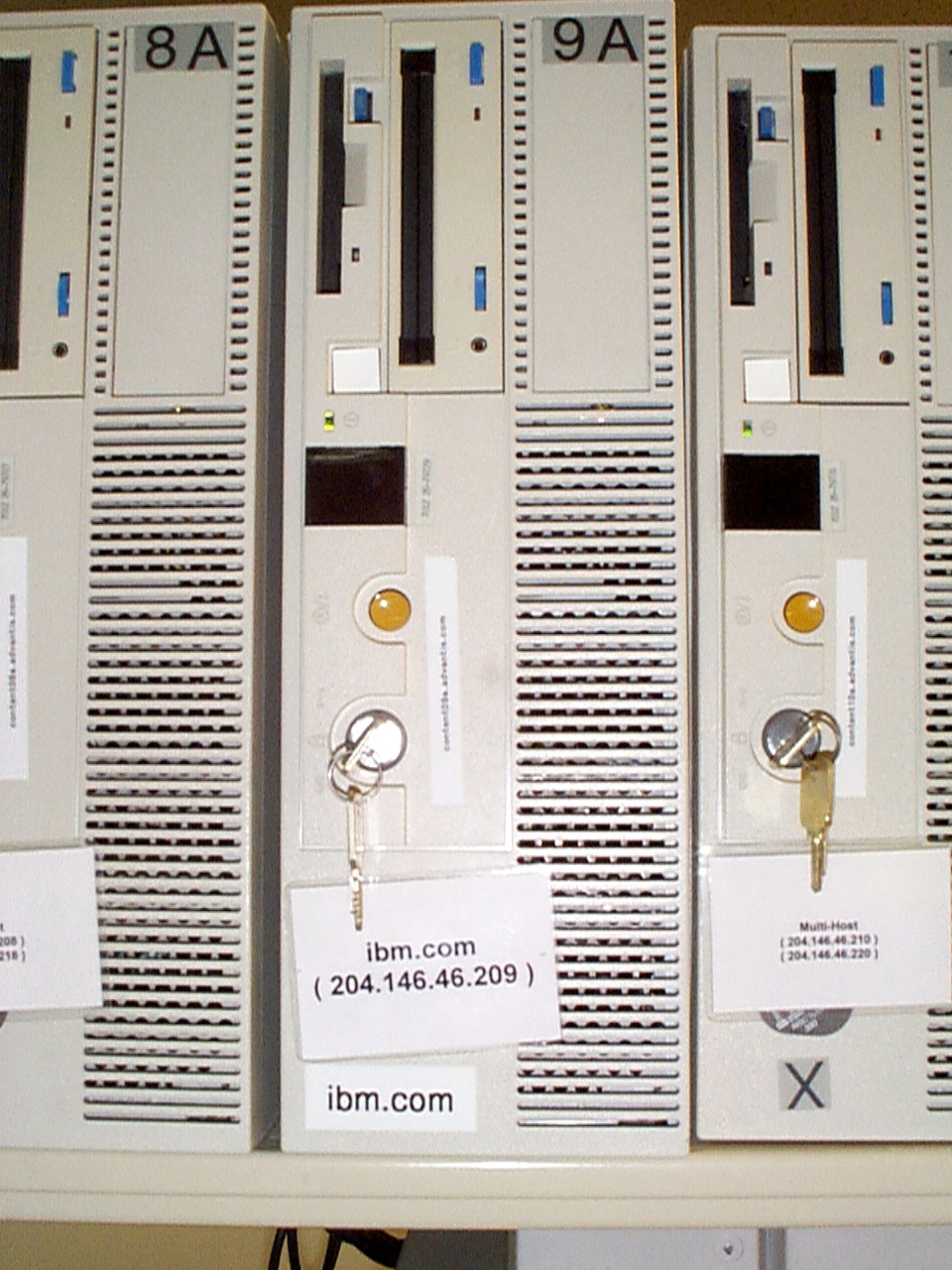
Type 7030 servers (model 3BT)

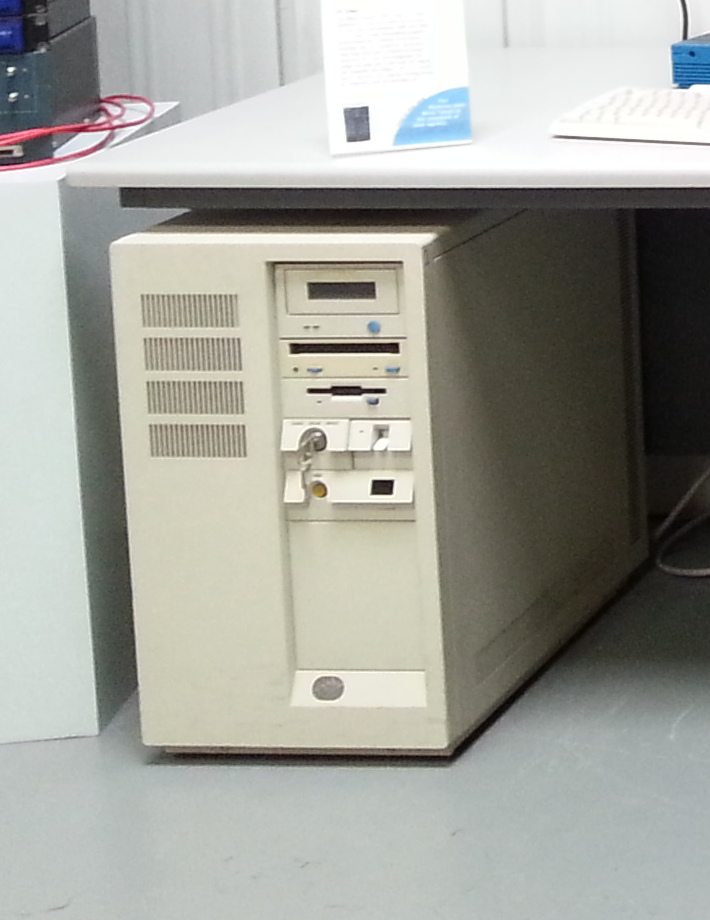
Early RS/6000 7013

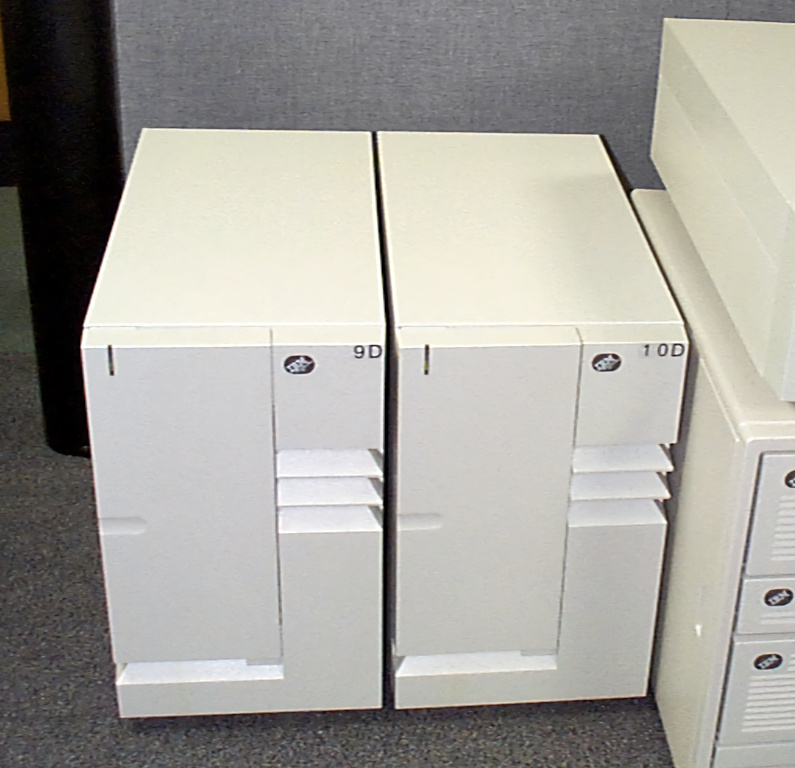
RS/6000 7013 J-series

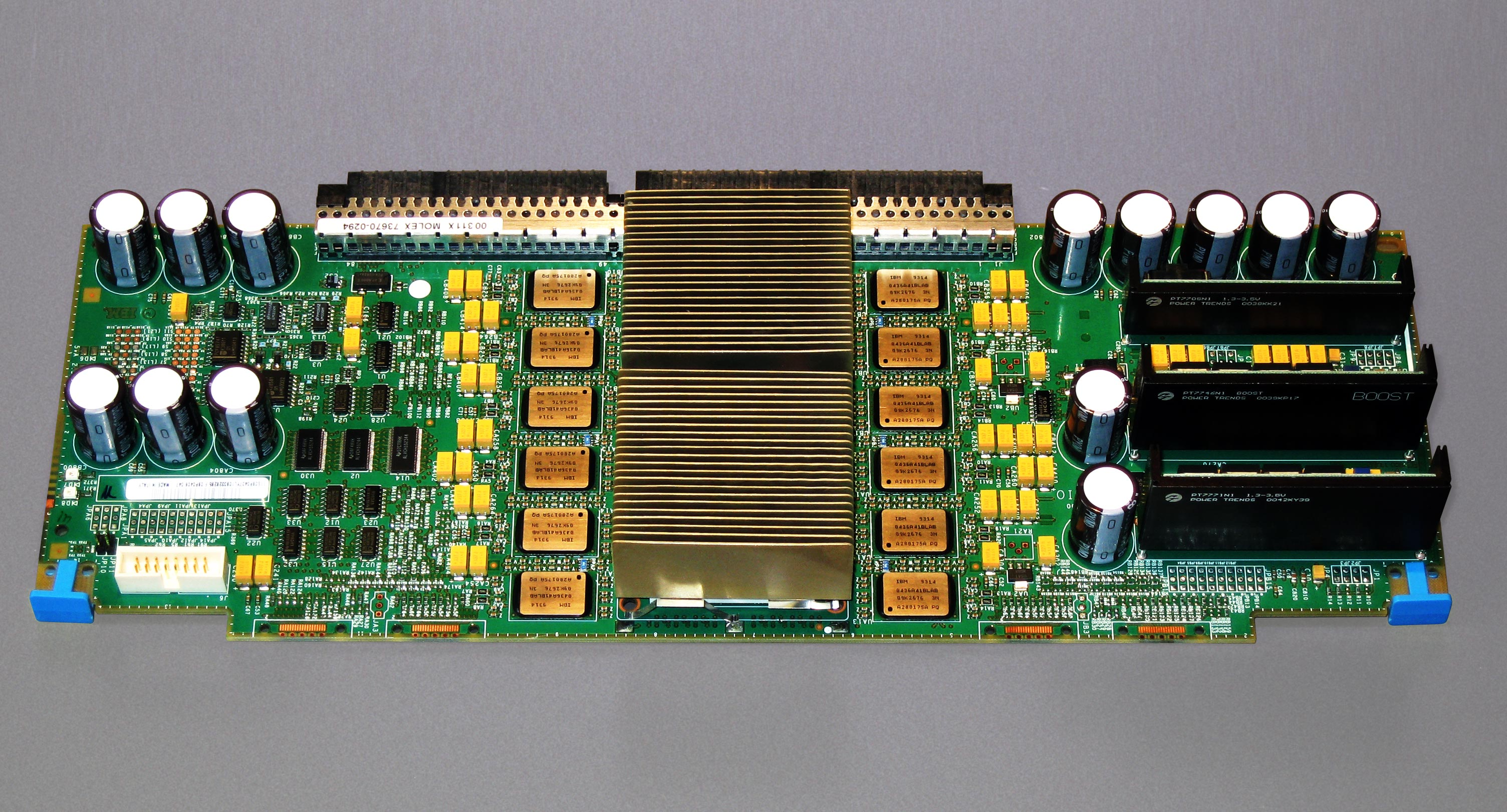
Dual 375 MHz IBM POWER3-II processors on the CPU module of a RS/6000 44P 270

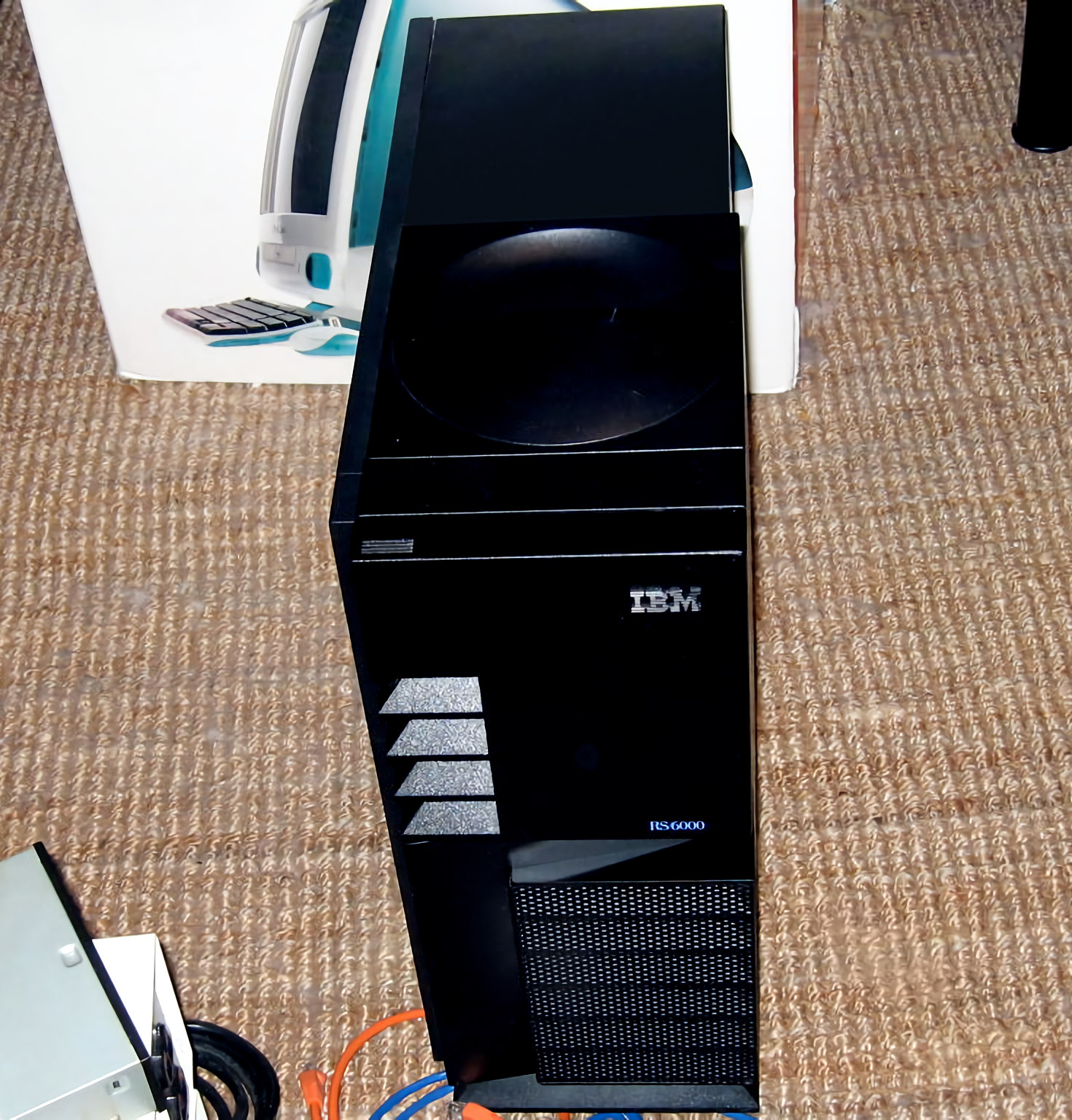
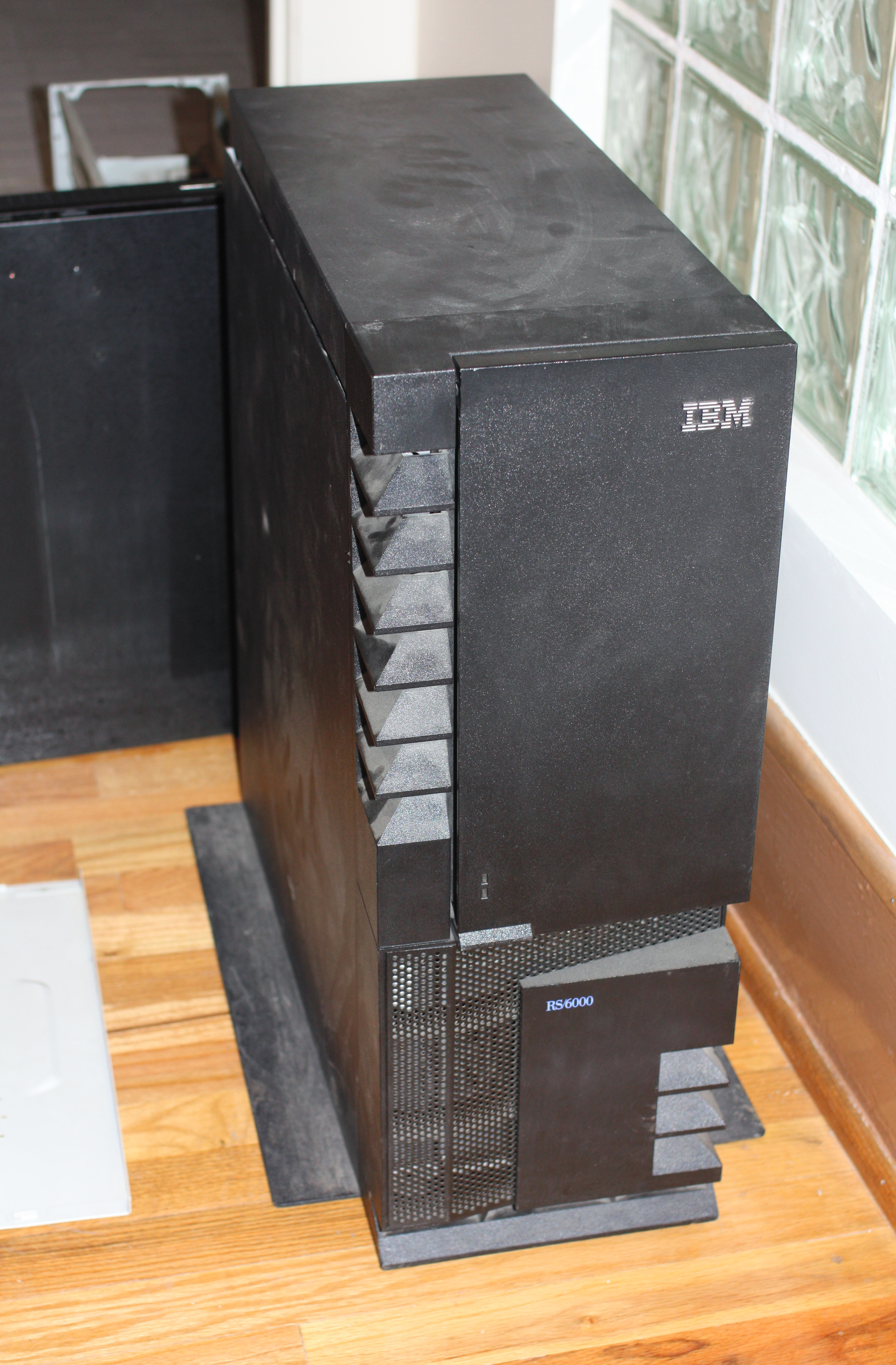
IBM RS6000 44P: model 170 and model 270

The RISC System/6000 is a family of RISC-based (Reduced Instruction Set Computer-based) Unix servers, workstations and supercomputers made by IBM in the 1990s. The RS/6000 family replaced the IBM RT PC computer platform in February 1990 and is the first computer line to see the use of IBM's POWER and PowerPC based microprocessors. In October 2000, the RS/6000 brand was retired for POWER-based servers and replaced by the eServer pSeries. Workstations continued under the RS/6000 brand until 2002, when new POWER/-based workstations were released under the IntelliStation POWER/ brand.

The RS/6000 floating-point execution unit (FPU) enabled major improvements in the speed and accuracy of floating-point operations. The key feature of the FPU was introducing the MAF (multiply-add fused) operation, which has since become standard in most modern processors.

== History ==
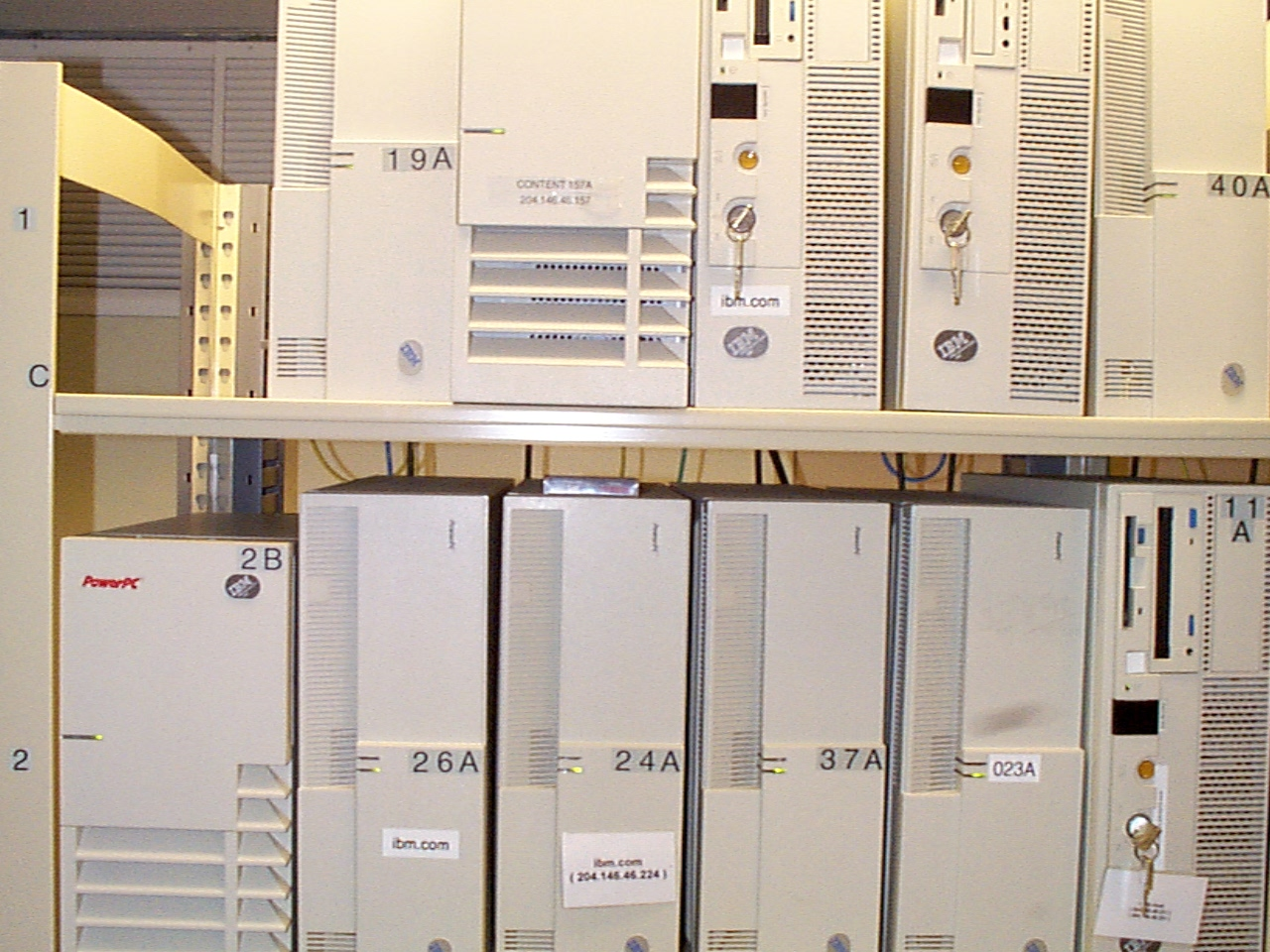
AIX RS/6000 servers running ibm.com in early 1998

After the RT PC—IBM's first Unix RISC workstation—achieved less than 2% market share, the company avoided using the RT name for its replacement. IBM's announcement of RS/6000 in February 1990 was its reentry into the fastest-growing segment of the PC market, and its use of AIX was the company's official endorsement of Unix. About 70 vendors demonstrated early versions of software at the introduction. About 100 more announced ports to the system, and IBM said it expected 1500 applications from 700 companies by the end of 1990.

IBM aggressively priced RS/6000 after its earlier failure to compete against Sun Microsystems, Hewlett-Packard, and Silicon Graphics. InfoWorld said that while RT PC "caused only laughter among competitors ... This time no one is laughing" at RS/6000, with performance superior to Sun and comparable prices. IBM said during the announcement that it was faster than competing systems from Sun, Hewlett-Packard, and Digital Equipment Corporation, and hoped that the company would have 15% of the workstation market by 1992. RS/6000's RISC technology also had a much better price/performance ratio than IBM's existing proprietary AS/400. Although the company described RS/6000 as being for scientific and engineering users, observers said that IBM intended it and AS/400 to compete with each other in the midrange system market, with non-technical software announcements beyond those available for competing workstations. The AS/400 division at IBM Rochester reportedly attempted to prevent the RS/6000 division at IBM Austin from selling the product at such a competitive price, and wanted to change its name to a number smaller than "400". An uninvolved company source said "The last thing IBM wanted to do was compete with itself. But it looks like that kind of thinking isn't going to work anymore".

The first RS/6000 models use the IBM Standard Micro Channel (SMC) bus; later models use PCI. Some later models conform to the PReP and CHRP standard platforms, co-developed with Apple and Motorola, with Open Firmware (OpenFW/OFW). The plan was to enable the RS/6000 to run multiple operating systems such as Windows NT, NetWare, OS/2, Solaris, Taligent, AIX and Mac OS but in the end only IBM's Unix variant AIX was used and supported on RS/6000. Linux is widely used on CHRP based RS/6000s, but support was added after the RS/6000 name was changed to eServer pSeries in 2000.

The RS/6000 family also includes the POWERserver servers, POWERstation workstations, and the IBM RS/6000 SP supercomputer platform. While most machines are desktops, desksides, or rack-mounted, there are laptop models too. Famous RS/6000s include the PowerPC 604e-based Deep Blue supercomputer that beat world champion Garry Kasparov at chess in 1997, and the POWER3-based ASCI White which was the fastest supercomputer in the world during 2000–2002.

== Architecture ==
=== Hardware ===
==== Service processor ====
Many RS/6000 and subsequent pSeries machines came with a service processor, which booted itself when power was applied and continuously ran its own firmware, independent of the operating system. The service processor could call a phone number (via a modem) in case of serious failure with the machine. Early advertisements and documentation called the service processor "System Guard", (or SystemGuard) although this name was apparently dropped later on, roughly around the same time that the simplified RS/6000 name was adopted for the computer line itself.

Late in the RS/6000 cycle, the service processor was "converged" with the one used on the AS/400 machines.

=== Software ===
POWER machines typically ran AIX. Solaris, OS/2 and Windows NT were also ported to PowerPC. Later Linux was also used.

Some AIX systems support IBM Web-based System Manager.

== Models ==
Type	Model	CPU	MHz	L2/L3 Cache	Bus	Memory	Enclosure	Introduced	Discontinued
7006	41T	PowerPC 601/601e	80	0 or 512 KB	Microchannel	16 to 256 MB	Desktop	1994-06-03	1997-01-10
7006	41W	PowerPC 601/601e	80	0 or 512 KB	Microchannel	16 to 256 MB	Desktop	1994-06-03	1997-07-18
7006	42T	PowerPC 604/604e	120	0 or 512 KB	Microchannel	Up to 256 MB	Desktop	1995-06-19	1997-09-24
7006	42W	PowerPC 604/604e	120	0 or 512 KB	Microchannel	Up to 256 MB	Desktop	1995-06-19	1997-09-24
7008	M20	POWER1	33	none	Microchannel	16 to 64 MB	All-in-one	1993-02-02	1995-01-06
7008	M2A	POWER1	33	none	Microchannel	16 to 64 MB	All-in-one	1993-02-02	1994-10-26
7009	C10	PowerPC 601	80	0 or 1 MB	Microchannel	16 to 256 MB	Desktop	1994-05-24	1997-07-18
7009	C1L	Unknown	Unknown	Unknown	Microchannel	Unknown	Unknown	Unknown	Unknown
7009	C20	PowerPC 604	120	1 MB	Microchannel	16 to 256 MB	Desktop	1995-06-19	1998-01-30
7010	150	Unknown	Unknown	Unknown	Microchannel	Unknown	Unknown	Unknown	Unknown
7010	160	PowerPC 603	66	Unknown	Microchannel	8 MB	Xstation	Unknown	Unknown
7010	220	PowerPC 604	120	Unknown	Microchannel	32 MB	Unknown	Unknown	Unknown
7011	220	RSC	33	none	Microchannel	?	Slimline Desktop	1992-01-21	1995-01-06
7011	22G	RSC	33	none	Microchannel	?	Slimline Desktop	?	?
7011	22W	RSC	33	none	Microchannel	Up to 64 MB	?	1993-09-21	1996-10-25
7011	223	RSC	?	none	Microchannel	Up to 64 MB	?	?	?
7011	230	RSC	45	128 KB	Microchannel	?	Slimline Desktop	1993-05-18	1995-01-06
7011	23E	RSC	45	128 KB	Microchannel	?	?	?	?
7011	23S	RSC	45	none	Microchannel	?	?	1993-05-18	1994-10-26
7011	23T	RSC	45	none	Microchannel	Up to 64 MB	?	1993-05-18	1994-10-26
7011	23W	RSC	45	none	Microchannel	Up to 64 MB	?	1993-05-18	1994-10-26
7011	250	PowerPC 601	66/80	none	Microchannel	16 to 256 MB	Slimline Desktop	1993-09-21	1997-07-18
7011	25E	PowerPC 601	66	?	Microchannel	16 to 256 MB	Planar upgrade (for 220 and 230 families)	?	?
7011	25F	PowerPC 601	80	?	Microchannel	16 to 256 MB	Planar upgrade (for 220, 230, and 66 MHz 250 families)	?	?
7011	25S	PowerPC 601	66/80	?	Microchannel	Up to 256 MB	?	1993-09-21	1996-10-25
7011	25T	PowerPC 601	66/80	?	Microchannel	Up to 256 MB	?	1993-09-21	1997-07-18
7011	25W	PowerPC 601	66/80	?	Microchannel	Up to 256 MB	?	1993-09-21	1996-10-25
7012 (Note: The 380, 390, and 39H servers correspond to the 3AT, 3BT, and 3CT workstations.)	320	POWER1	20	none	Microchannel	8 to 32 MB	Desktop	1990-02-15	1992-10-28
7012	32E	?	?	?	Microchannel	?	?	?	?
7012	32T	POWER1	20	none	Microchannel	8 to 64 MB	Tower	?	1992-10-28
7012	32H	POWER1	25	none	Microchannel	Up to 128 MB	Desktop	1991-03-12	1994-10-26
7012	340	POWER1	33	none	Microchannel	Up to 256 MB	Desktop	1992-01-21	1994-11-04
7012	34H	POWER1	41.6	none	Microchannel	Up to 256 MB	Desktop	1993-07-13	1994-10-26
7012	34L	?	?	?	Microchannel	?	?	?	?
7012	34R	?	?	?	Microchannel	?	?	?	?
7012	350	POWER1	41	none	Microchannel	Up to 128 MB	Desktop	1992-01-21	1993-08-18
7012	355	POWER1	41	none	Microchannel	?	?	1993-02-02	1994-10-26
7012	35R	?	?	?	Microchannel	?	?	?	?
7012	360	POWER1+	50	none	Microchannel	Up to 256 MB	Desktop	1993-02-02	1994-11-04
7012	365	POWER1+	50	none	Microchannel	Up to 128 MB	Desktop	1993-02-02	1994-10-26
7012	36T	POWER1+	50	none	Microchannel	Up to 256 MB	?	1993-05-18	1994-10-26
7012	370	POWER1++	62.5	none	Microchannel	Up to 256 MB	?	1993-02-02	1996-05-20
7012	375	POWER1++	62.5	none	Microchannel	Up to 128 MB	?	1993-02-02	1994-10-26
7012	37T	POWER1++	62.5	none	Microchannel	Up to 256 MB	?	1993-05-18	1996-05-20
7012	380	POWER2+	59	none/0.5/1 MB	Microchannel	32 to 512 MB	Desktop	1994-05-24	1996-05-20
7012	390	POWER2+	67	1 MB	Microchannel	32 to 512 MB	Desktop	1994-05-24	1997-07-18
7012	397	P2SC	160	?	Microchannel	128 to 1024 MB	Desktop	1997-10-06	1999-03-19
7012	39H	POWER2	67	none/1/2 MB	Microchannel	64 to 512 MB	Desktop	1995-02-07	1998-01-30
7012	39T	?	?	?	Microchannel	?	?	?	?
7012	G02	?	?	?	Microchannel	?	Tower	?	?
7012	G30	PowerPC 601 (2 or 4)	75	?	Microchannel	32 to 512 MB	Tower	1994-10-04	1996-10-23
7012	G40	PowerPC 604 (2 or 4)	112	0.5 MB per CPU	Microchannel	64 MB to 1 GB	Tower	1996-07-23	1998-01-08
7030	355	POWER1	41	?	Microchannel	?	?	?	?
7030	375	POWER1++	62.5	?	Microchannel	?	?	?	?
7030	37T	?	?	?	Microchannel	?	?	?	?
7030	397	P2SC	160	?	Microchannel	?	Desktop	1997-10-06	1999-01-19
7030	3AT	POWER2+	59	none	Microchannel	32 to 512 MB	Desktop	1994-05-24	1997-01-10
7030	3BT	POWER2+	67	0.5 or 1 MB	Microchannel	32 to 512 MB	Desktop	1994-05-24	1998-01-08
7030	3CT	POWER2	67	none/1/2 MB	Microchannel	64 to 512 MB	Desktop	1995-02-07	1998-01-08
7013	520	POWER1	20	none	Microchannel	8 to 128 MB	Deskside	1990-02-15	1992-04-21
7013	52E	?	?	?	Microchannel	?	?	?	?
7013	52H	POWER1	25	none	Microchannel	Up to 512 MB	Deskside	1992-01-21	1995-01-06
7013	530	POWER1	25	none	Microchannel	16 to 128 MB	Deskside	1990-02-15	1992-01-02
7013	53H	POWER1	33	none	Microchannel	32 to 512 MB HD3 (33 MHz)	Deskside	1991-10-02	1993-08-18
7013	53E	POWER1	33	none	Microchannel	32 to 512 MB HD3 (33 MHz)	Deskside	1992-01-21	?
7013	540	POWER1	30	none	Microchannel	64 to 256 MB	Deskside	1990-02-15	1992-01-02
7013	550	POWER1	41.6	none	Microchannel	64 MB to 1 GB	Deskside	1990-10-30	1993-08-18
7013	55E	?	?	?	Microchannel	?	?	?	?
7013	55L	POWER1	41.6	none	Microchannel	Up to 256 MB	Deskside	1993-05-18	1994-10-26
7013	55S	?	?	?	Microchannel	?	?	?	?
7013	560	POWER1+	50	none	Microchannel	Up to 1 GB	Deskside	1992-01-21	1993-12-21
7013	56F	?	?	?	Microchannel	?	?	?	?
7013	570	POWER1+	50	none	Microchannel	Up to 1 GB	Deskside	1993-02-02	1996-05-20
7013	571	?	?	?	Microchannel	?	?	?	?
7013	57F	?	?	?	Microchannel	?	?	?	?
7013	57L	?	?	?	Microchannel	?	?	?	?
7013	580	POWER1++	62.5	none	Microchannel	64 MB to 1 GB	Deskside	1992-09-22	1996-05-20
7013	58F	POWER1++	62.5	none	Microchannel	64 MB to 1 GB	Deskside	1992-11-27	?
7013	58H	POWER2	55.6	none	Microchannel	64 MB to 2 GB	Deskside	1993-09-21	1996-10-25
7013	590	POWER2	66.7	none	Microchannel	64 MB to 2 GB	Deskside	1993-09-21	1997-09-24
7013	591	POWER2	77	none	Microchannel	64 MB to 2 GB	Deskside	1995-07-25	1997-07-18
7013	595	P2SC	135	none	Microchannel	64 MB to 2 GB	Deskside	1996-10-08	1999-01-08
7013	59H	POWER2+	66.7	1 MB	Microchannel	64 MB to 2 GB	Deskside	1994-05-24	1997-01-10
7013	J01	?	?	?	Microchannel	?	?	?	?
7013	J30	PowerPC 601 (2 or 4)	75	?	Microchannel	128 MB to 2 GB	Deskside	1994-10-04	1996-10-23
7013	J40	PowerPC 604 (2 to 8)	112	1 MB	Microchannel	128 MB to 2 GB	Deskside	1996-08-30	1998-01-08
7013	J50	PowerPC 604e (2 to 8)	200	?	Microchannel	?	Deskside	1997-04-30	1999-01-08
7016	730 (Note: The 7016-730 model was a version of 7013-530 model, but with licensed by Silicon Graphics graphics card.[1])	POWER1	25	none	Microchannel	16 to 128 MB	Deskside	1990	?
7016	731	?	?	?	Microchannel	?	?	?	?
7015 (Note: Type 7015 uses a IBM 9309 Rack Enclosure; this a first generation RS/6000 server running AIX. These units were configured by IBM as experimental "NSS" ("Network Switching Subsystem") routers, and used on the NSFnet T3 backbone in the early/mid-90s.)	920	?	?	?	Microchannel	?	?	?	?
7015	930	POWER1	25	none	Microchannel	16 to 128 MB	Rack tower	1990-02-15	1992-07-15
7015	950	POWER1	41	?	Microchannel	Up to 512 MB	Rack tower	1991-05-07	1993-12-21
7015	95E	?	?	?	Microchannel	?	?	?	?
7015	960	?	?	?	Microchannel	?	?	?	?
7015	970	POWER1+	50	?	Microchannel	Up to 1 GB	Rack tower	1992-04-21	1993-08-18
7015	97B	POWER1+	50	?	Microchannel	?	Rack tower	1993-02-02	1995-01-06
7015	97E	?	?	?	Microchannel	?	?	?	?
7015	97F	?	?	?	Microchannel	?	?	?	?
7015	980	POWER1++	62.5	none	Microchannel	Up to 1 GB	Rack tower	1992-09-22	1993-08-18
7015	98B	POWER1++	62.5	?	Microchannel	?	Rack tower	1993-02-02	1996-05-20
7015	98E	?	?	?	Microchannel	?	?	?	?
7015	98F	?	?	?	Microchannel	?	?	?	?
7015	990	POWER2	71.5	none	Microchannel	128 MB to 2 GB	Rack tower	1993-09-21	1996-05-20
7015	99E	Unknown	Unknown	Unknown	Microchannel	Unknown	Unknown	Unknown	Unknown
7015	99F	Unknown	Unknown	Unknown	Microchannel	Unknown	Unknown	Unknown	Unknown
7015	99J	Unknown	Unknown	Unknown	Microchannel	Unknown	Unknown	Unknown	Unknown
7015	99K	Unknown	Unknown	Unknown	Microchannel	Unknown	Unknown	Unknown	Unknown
7015	R10	POWER1+	50	none	Microchannel	128 MB to 1 GB	6U racks	1994-05-24	1996-05-20
7015	R20	POWER2+	66	1 MB	Microchannel	128 MB to 2 GB	6U racks	1994-05-24	1998-01-30
7015	R21	POWER2	77	?	Microchannel	?	6U racks	1995-07-25	1996-10-25
7015	R24	POWER2+	71.5	2 MB	Microchannel	128 MB to 2 GB	10U racks	1994-05-24	1998-01-30
7015	R30	PowerPC 601 (2 or 4)	75	?	Microchannel	128 MB to 2 GB	6U racks	1994-10-04	1996-10-23
7015	R40	PowerPC 604 (2 to 8)	112	?	Microchannel	128 MB to 2 GB	6U racks	1996-07-23	1998-01-08
7015	R4U	?	?	?	Microchannel	?	?	?	?
7015	R50	PowerPC 604e (2 to 8)	200	?	Microchannel	Up to 4 GB	6U racks	1997-04-15	2000-08-15
7015	R5U	?	?	?	Microchannel	?	?	?	?
7017	S70	RS64	125	?	PCI	?	2+ racks	1997-10-31	1999-12-13
7017	S70	RS64-II	262	?	PCI	?	2+ racks	1998-10-05	1999-12-13
7017	S7A	RS64-II	262	8 MB	PCI	1 to 32 GB	2+ racks	1998-10-23	2000-12-01
7017	S80	RS64-III	450	8 MB	PCI	2 to 64 GB	2+ racks	1999-09-24	2001-08-31
7017	S85	RS64-III / IV	450/600	8/16 MB	PCI	2 to 96 GB	Racks	2000-11-17	?
7020	0U0	PowerPC 601	66	?	PCI	?	Desktop	1994-10-04	1996-01-19
7020	40P	PowerPC 601	66	?	PCI	16 to 192 MB	Desktop	?	?
7020	B1B	PowerPC 601	66	?	PCI	?	Desktop	1994-10-04	1996-01-19
7020	B1C	PowerPC 601	66	?	PCI	?	Desktop	1994-10-04	1996-01-19
7020	D1D	PowerPC 601	66	?	PCI	?	Desktop	1994-10-04	1996-01-19
7020	D2D	PowerPC 601	66	?	PCI	?	Desktop	1994-10-04	1996-01-19
7020	D4E	?	?	?	PCI	?	Desktop	1995-02-07	1996-01-19
7020	SPE	PowerPC 601	66	?	PCI	?	Desktop	1994-10-04	1996-01-19
7024	E20	PowerPC 604	100/133	512 KB	PCI	16 to 512 MB	Tower	1995-10-10	1997-07-18
7024	E20	PowerPC 604e	233	512 KB	PCI	16 to 512 MB	Tower	1997-04-??	?
7024	E30	PowerPC 604	133/166	?	PCI	64 to 1024 MB	Tower	1996-04-23	1999-03-19
7024	E30	PowerPC 604e	233	?	PCI	64 to 1024 MB	Tower	1997-04-??	1999-03-19
7025	F30	PowerPC 604	133/166	?	PCI	Up to 1 GB	Tower	1996-02-20	1998-01-08
7025	F40	PowerPC 604e (1 or 2)	166/233	?	PCI	Up to 1 GB	Tower	1996-10-08	2000-05-08
7025	F50	PowerPC 604e (1 to 4)	166/332	256 KB	PCI	128 MB to 3 GB	Tower	1997-04-25	2001-07-17
7025	F80	RS64-III (1 to 6)	450/500	2/4 MB (SMP)	PCI	8/16 GB (SMP)	Deskside	2000-05-09	2001-07-13
7025	F85	?	?	?	PCI	?	?	?	?
7026	H10	PowerPC 604e (1 or 2)	166/233	?	PCI	Up to 1 GB	7U racks	1997-02-14	1998-02-27
7026	H50	PowerPC 604e (1 to 4)	332	?	PCI	Up to 3 GB	8U racks	1998-02-20	2000-12-01
7026	H70	RS64-II (1 to 4)	340	?	PCI	Up to 8 GB	8U racks	1999-04-23	2001-07-17
7026	H80	RS64-III/IV (1 to 6)	450/500	?	PCI	Up to 16 GB	5U racks	2000-06-09	2001-07-13
7026	M80	RS64-III/IV (2 to 8)	500/750	?	PCI	?	8U racks	2000-06-09	2002-01-31
7026	B80	?	?	?	PCI	?	5U racks	?	?
7248	43P	PowerPC 604	100/120/132/166	256/512 KB	PCI	16 to 192 MB	Desktop	1995-06-19	1997-07-18
7043	43P-140	PowerPC 604e	166/200/233/332	1 MB	PCI	32 to 768 MB	Desktop	1996-10-08	2000-12-01
7043	43P-150	PowerPC 604e	250/375	1 MB	PCI	64 MB to 1 GB	Desktop	1998-10-05	2003-12-12
7043	43P-240	PowerPC 604e (1 or 2)	166/233	512 KB/1 MB per CPU	PCI	64 MB to 1 GB	Desktop	1996-10-08	1999-03-19
7043	43P-260	POWER3 (1 or 2)	200	4 MB per CPU	PCI	128 MB to 4 GB	Tower	1998-10-05	2000-12-01
7043	43P-270	POWER3-II (up to 4)	200/375/450	4/8 MB per CPU	PCI	up to 8 GB	Tower	2000-02-25	2003-09-12
7044	44P-170	POWER3-II	333/400/450	1/4/8 MB	PCI	256 MB to 2 GB	Tower	2000-02-07	2003-12-12
7044	44P-270	POWER3-II (Up to 4)	375/450	4/8 MB	PCI	256 MB to 16 GB	Tower	2000-02-07	2003-09-12
7046	B50	PowerPC 604e	375	1 MB	PCI	Up to 1 GB	2U racks	1999-09-13	2003-09-12
7317	F3L	PowerPC 604	133	512 KB	PCI	32 to 960 MB	17U racks	1996-10-08	1999-12-13
7317	F3L	PowerPC 604e	166	1 MB	PCI	32 MB to 1 GB	17U racks	1996-10-08	1999-12-13
7317	F3L	PowerPC 604e	233	512 KB	PCI	32 MB to 1 GB	17U racks	1996-10-08	1999-12-13
7007	N40	PowerPC 601	50	?	Unknown	16 to 64 MB	Laptop	1994-03-08	1997-06-30
7249	851	PowerPC 603e	100	256 KB	Unknown	32 to 96 MB	Laptop	1996-02-20	1996-11-08
7249	860	PowerPC 603e	166	256 KB	Unknown	32 to 96 MB	Laptop	1996-10-08	1998-01-30

The Model N40 was a PowerPC-based laptop developed and manufactured by Tadpole Technology in conjunction with IBM. It was released on 25 March 1994, priced at US$12,000. The internal batteries could power the system for 45 minutes only and an external battery pack that lasted for 4 hours was available for this reason.

== See also ==
Preceded by IBM RT PC	IBM RS/6000; 1990 - 2000	Succeeded by IBM System p
