= ASCI White =

Former supercomputer in the United States

ASCI White was a supercomputer at the Lawrence Livermore National Laboratory in California, which was the fastest supercomputer in the world from November 2000 to November 2001.

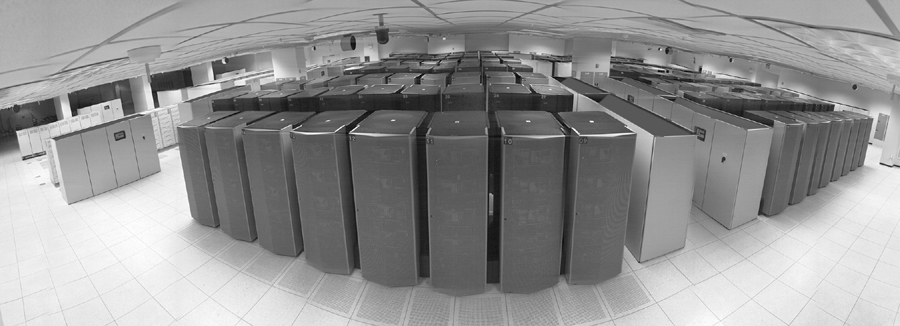
Fisheye view of ASCI White

It was a computer cluster based on IBM's commercial IBM RS/6000 SP computer. 512 nodes were interconnected for ASCI White, with each node containing sixteen 375 MHz IBM POWER3-II processors. In total, the ASCI White had 8,192 processors, 6 terabytes (TB) of memory, and 160 TB of disk storage. It was almost exclusively used for large-scale computations requiring dozens, hundreds, or thousands of processors. The computer weighed 106 tons and consumed 3 MW of electricity with a further 3 MW needed for cooling. It had a theoretical processing speed of 12.3 teraFLOPS (TFLOPS). The system ran IBM's AIX operating system.

ASCI White was made up of three individual systems, the 512-node White, the 28-node Ice and the 68-node Frost.

The system was built in Poughkeepsie, New York. Completed in June 2000 it was transported to specially built facilities in California and officially dedicated on August 15, 2001. Its peak performance of 12.3 TFLOPS was not achieved in the widely accepted LINPACK tests. The system cost US$110 million (equivalent to $206 million in 2025).

It was built as stage three of the Accelerated Strategic Computing Initiative (ASCI) started by the U.S. Department of Energy and the National Nuclear Security Administration to build a simulator to replace live nuclear weapons testing following the moratorium imposed by the Comprehensive Test Ban Treaty started by President George H. W. Bush in 1992 and extended by Bill Clinton in 1993.

The machine was decommissioned on July 27, 2006.

Records
Preceded by ASCI Red; 2.379 teraflops	World's most powerful supercomputer November 2000 – November 2001	Succeeded by NEC Earth Simulator; 35.86 teraflops
