= RISC Single Chip =

The RISC Single Chip, or RSC, is a single-chip microprocessor developed and fabricated by International Business Machines (IBM). The RSC was a feature-reduced single-chip implementation of the POWER1, a multi-chip central processing unit (CPU) which implemented the POWER instruction set architecture (ISA). It was used in entry-level workstation models of the IBM RS/6000 family, such as the Model 220 and 230.

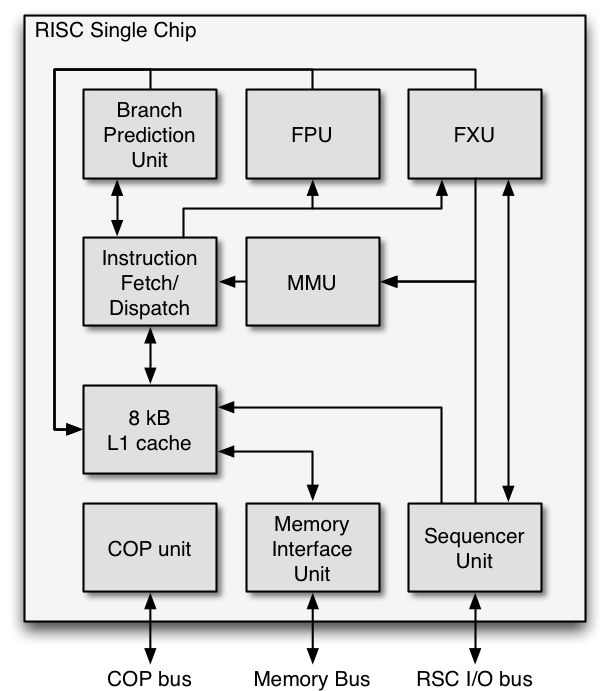
Logic schematic of the RSC chip

The RSC operated at frequencies of 33 and 45 MHz. It has three execution units: a fixed point unit, floating point unit and branch processor; and an 8 KB unified instruction and data cache. Like the POWER1, the memory controller and I/O was tightly integrated, with the functional units responsible for the functions: a memory interface unit and sequencer unit; residing on the same die as the processor. The RSC contains nine functional units: fixed-point execution unit (FXU), floating-point execution unit (FPU), the memory management unit (MMU), memory interface unit (MIU), sequencer unit, common on-chip processor unit (COP), instruction fetch unit, and instruction queue and dispatch unit.

The fixed point unit executes integer instructions, generates addresses in load store operations and some portions of branch instructions. It has a three-stage pipeline consisting of decode, execute and writeback stages. Some instructions require several cycles in the execute stage before they are completed.

The floating point unit executes floating point instructions. Unlike the POWER1, the RSC does not have register renaming capability due to a limited die area in which the unit must fit in. To further save die area, the floating point multiply-add array is 32 bits wide. To perform 64-bit (double-precision) operations, the operands are broken into two, and the instruction passes twice through the multiply-add array. The floating point pipeline consists of four stages, decode, multiply, add and writeback.

The RSC has an 8 KB unified cache instead of the separate instruction and large data caches like the POWER1. The unified cache is two-way set associative and uses a store-through policy with no reload on a store miss and a least recently used (LRU) replacement policy. It has a cache line size of 64 bytes, and each cache line is sectored into four quadwords (16 bytes), with each quadword given its own valid bit in the cache directory. During each cycle, four words can be read from it and two doublewords can be written to it.

The memory data bus is 72 bits wide, with 64 bits used for the data path and 8 bits used for error correcting code (ECC). The memory interface unit manages the bus and performs ECC checks on data coming into the processor. The ECC logic is capable of correcting single-bit errors. Compared to the POWER1, the RSC memory data bus is narrower and uses industry standard SIMMs instead of custom memory cards.

The RSC contained approximately one million transistors on a 14.9 mm by 15.2 mm (226.48 mm^{2}) die fabricated by IBM in a complementary metal-oxide semiconductor (CMOS) process with a minimal feature size of 0.8 μm and three levels of wiring. It is packaged in a 36 mm by 36 mm ceramic pin grid array module which had 201 signal pins. It required a 3.6 volt power supply and consumed 4 watts during operation at 33 MHz.

== See also ==
- PowerPC 601 which essentially was a cheaper and less powerful version of RSC with some PowerPC instructions added.
- RAD6000 which is a radiation hardened version of RSC.
