= Power Mac G5 =

Line of tower computers designed and manufactured by Apple

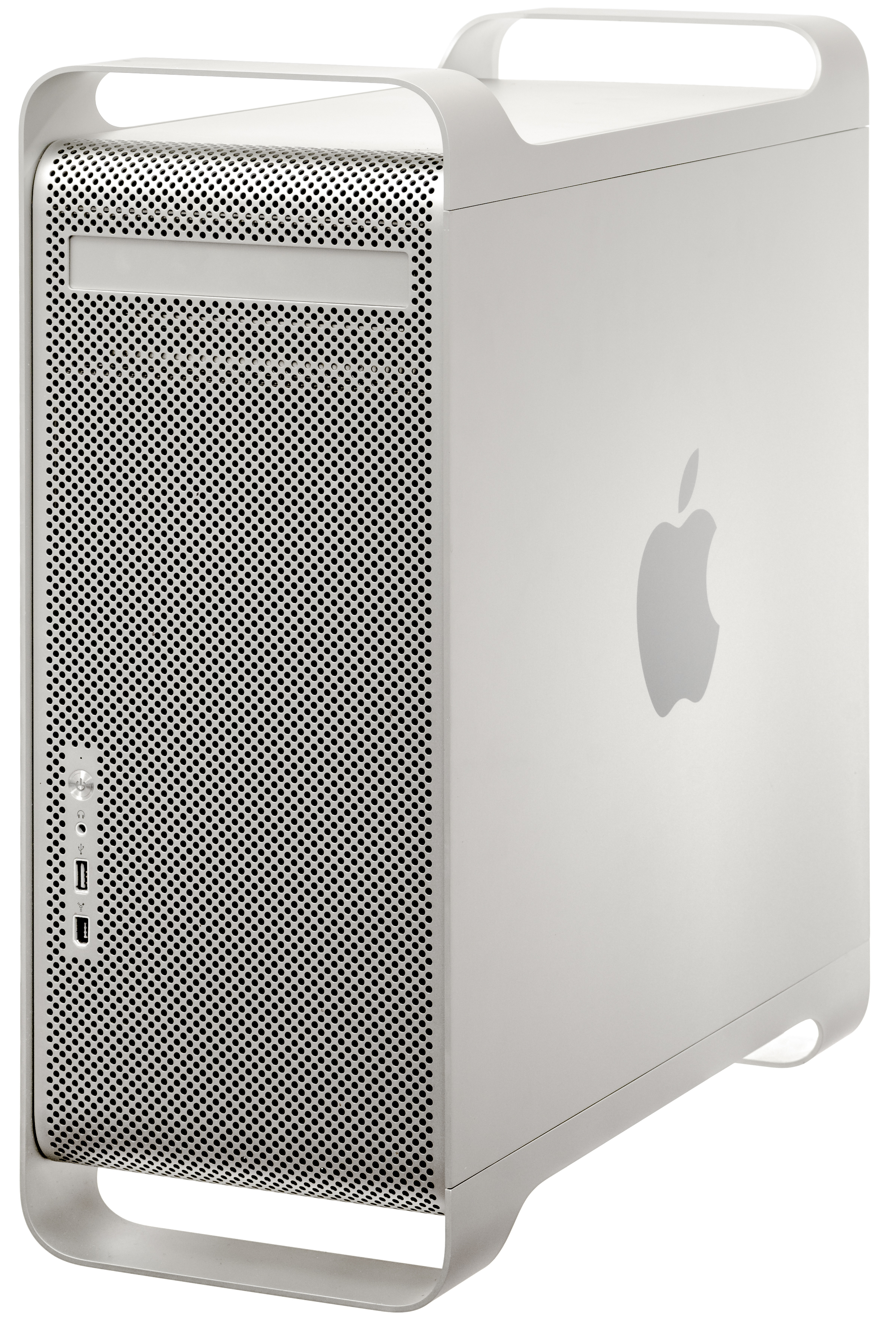
- Apple Power Mac G5
- Developer: Apple Computer, Inc.
- Manufacturer: Apple Computer; Foxconn
- Product family: Power Macintosh
- Type: Desktop
- Released: June 23, 2003
- Introductory price: US$1,999 (equivalent to $3,500 in 2025)
- Discontinued: August 7, 2006
- CPU: 1.6 – 2.7 GHz PowerPC G5; Single-processor; Dual-processors, single-core Dual-core; Dual-processors, dual-core
- Predecessor: Power Mac G4
- Successor: Mac Pro
- Related: iMac G5; PowerBook G4
- Made in: USA, China

The Power Mac G5 is a series of personal computers designed, manufactured, and sold by Apple Computer, Inc. from 2003 to 2006 as part of the Power Mac series. When introduced, it was the most powerful computer in Apple's Macintosh lineup, and was marketed by the company as the world's first 64-bit desktop computer. It was also the first desktop computer from Apple to use an anodized aluminum alloy enclosure, and one of only three computers in Apple's lineup to utilize the PowerPC 970 CPU, the others being the iMac G5 and the Xserve G5.

Three generations of Power Mac G5 were released before it was discontinued as part of the Mac transition to Intel processors, making way for its replacement, the Mac Pro. The Mac Pro retained a variation of the G5's enclosure design for seven more years, making it among the longest-lived designs in Apple's history.

== Introduction ==
Officially launched as part of Steve Jobs' keynote presentation at the Worldwide Developers Conference in June 2003, the Power Mac G5 was introduced with three models, sharing the same physical case, but differing in features and performance. Although somewhat larger than the G4 tower it replaced, the necessity for a complex cooling system meant that the G5 tower had room inside for only one optical drive and two hard drives. The lack of drive expansion caused enough problems for some users that 3rd party manufacturers introduced a number hard drive brackets that mounts in front of the front CPU fans providing room for three additional drives. They typically use a splitter cable from the optical drive for power and require the end user to provide their own storage controller card with internal ports to interface with the Power Mac G5.

Steve Jobs stated during his keynote presentation that the Power Mac G5 would reach 3 GHz "within 12 months." This would never come to pass; after three years, the G5 only reached 2.7 GHz before it was replaced by the Intel Xeon-based Mac Pro, which debuted with processors running at speeds of up to 3 GHz.

During the presentation, Apple also showed Virginia Tech's Mac OS X computer cluster supercomputer (a.k.a. supercluster) known as System X, consisting of 1,100 Power Mac G5 towers operating as processing nodes. The supercomputer managed to become one of the top five supercomputers that year. The computer was soon dismantled and replaced with a new cluster made of an equal number of Xserve G5 rack-mounted servers, which also used the G5 chip running at 2.3 GHz.

== PowerPC G5 and the IBM partnership ==
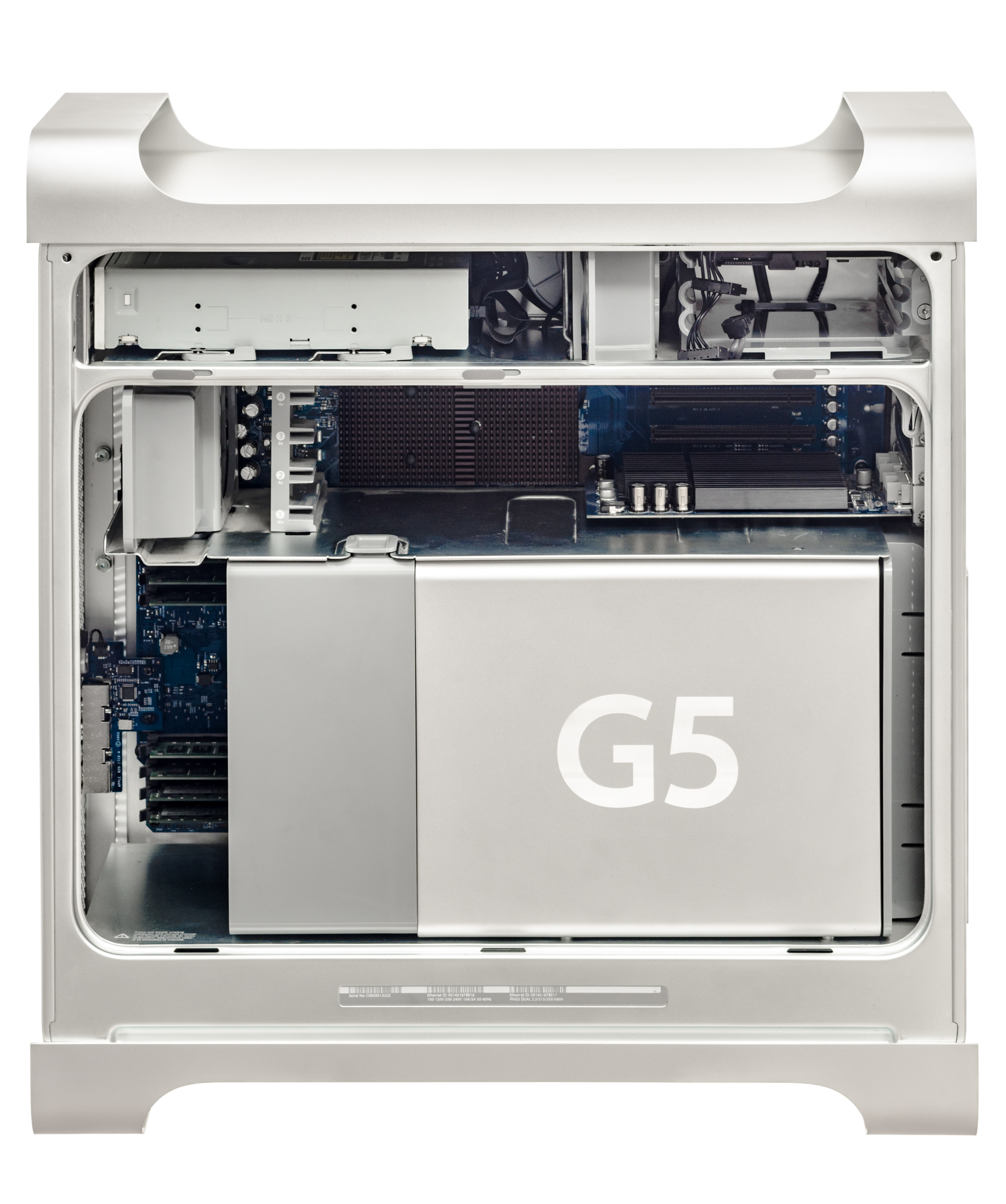
The inside of a Power Mac G5, late 2005 model

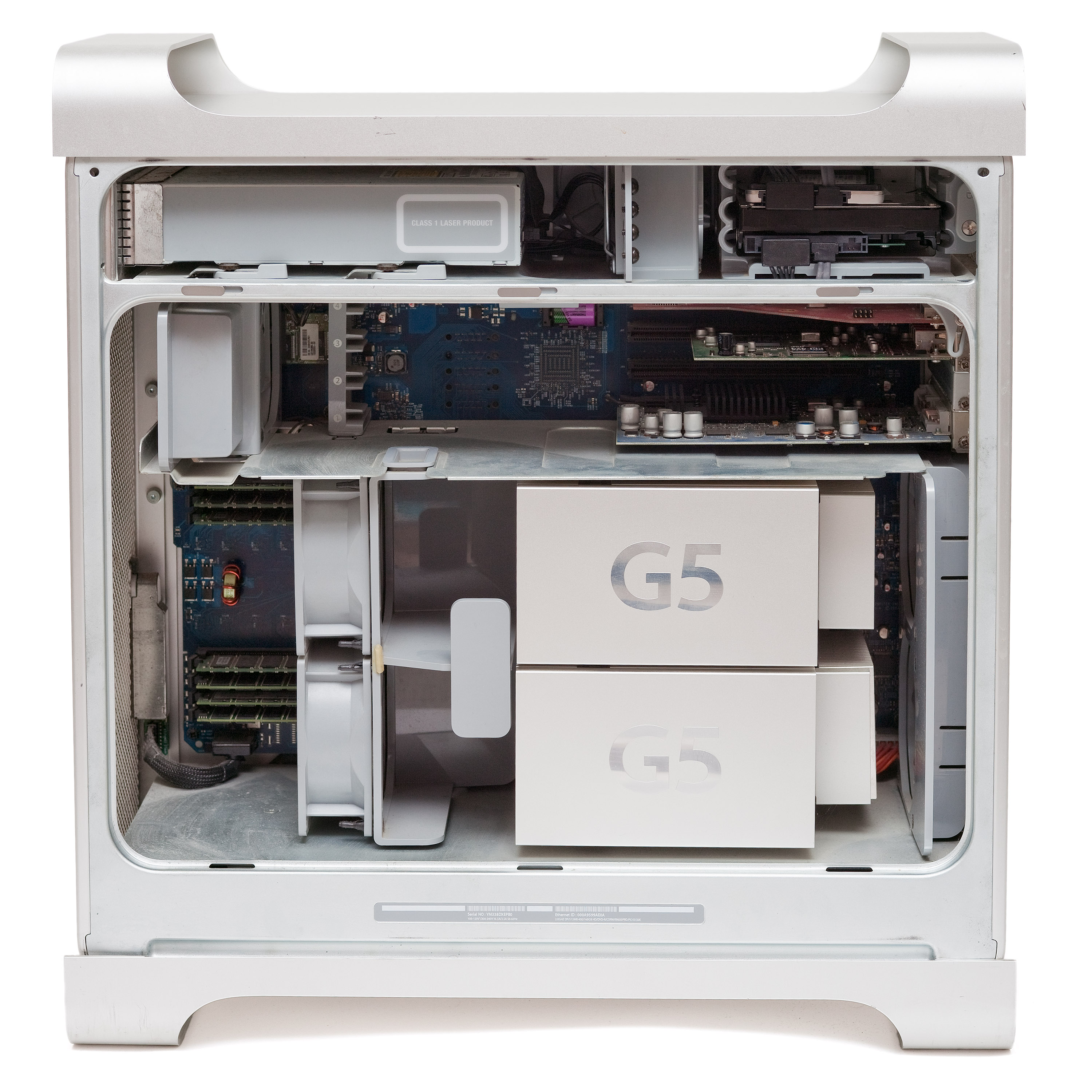
The inside of an air-cooled dual-processor 2003 model

The PowerPC G5 (called the PowerPC 970 by its manufacturer, IBM) is based upon IBM's 64-bit POWER4 microprocessor. At the Power Mac G5's introduction, Apple announced a partnership with IBM in which IBM would continue to produce PowerPC variants of their POWER processors. According to IBM's Dr. John E. Kelly, "The goal of this partnership is for Apple and IBM to come together so that Apple customers get the best of both worlds, the tremendous creativity from the Apple corporation and the tremendous technology from the IBM corporation. IBM invested over US$3 billion in a new lab to produce these large, 300 mm wafers." This completely automated facility in East Fishkill, New York figured heavily in IBM's larger microelectronics strategy.

The original PowerPC 970 had 50 million transistors and was manufactured using IBM CMOS 9S at 130 nm fabrication process. CMOS 9S is the combination of SOI, low-k dielectric insulation, and copper interconnect technology, which were invented at IBM research in the mid-1990s. Subsequent revisions of the "G5" processor have included IBM's PowerPC 970FX (same basic design on a 90 nm process), and the PowerPC 970MP (essentially two 970FX cores on one die). Apple refers to the dual-core PowerPC 970MP processors as either the "G5 Dual" (for single-socket, dual-core configurations), or Power Mac G5 Quad (for dual-socket, four-core configurations).

== Architecture ==
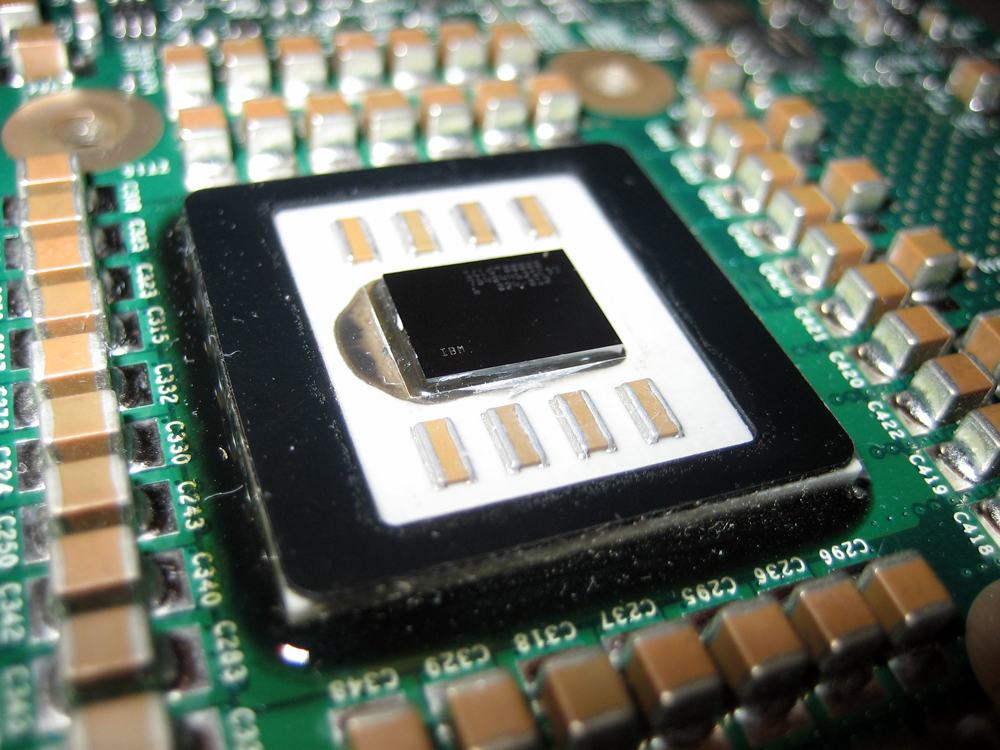
The PowerPC 970FX inside a PowerMac G5.

The Power Mac G5 line in 2006 consisted of three, dual-core PowerPC G5 configurations, which can communicate through its HyperTransport at half its internal clock speed. Each processor in the Power Mac G5 has two unidirectional 32-bit pathways: one leading to the processor and the other from the processor. These result in a total bandwidth of up to 20 GB/s. The processor at the heart of the Power Mac G5 has a "superscalar, superpipelined" execution core that can handle up to 216 in-flight instructions, and uses a 128-bit, 162-instruction SIMD unit (AltiVec).

All modern 32-bit x86 processors since the Pentium Pro have the Physical Address Extension (PAE) feature, which permits them to use a 36-bit physical memory address to address a maximum of 2^{36} bytes (64 gigabytes) of physical memory, while the PowerPC 970 processor is capable of addressing 2^{42} bytes (4 terabytes) of physical memory and 2^{64} bytes (16 exabytes) of virtual memory. Due to its 64-bit processor (and 42-bit MMU), the final revision of the Power Mac G5 can hold 16 GB of Dual-Channel DDR2 PC4200 RAM using eight memory slots, with support for ECC memory.

== Product revision history ==
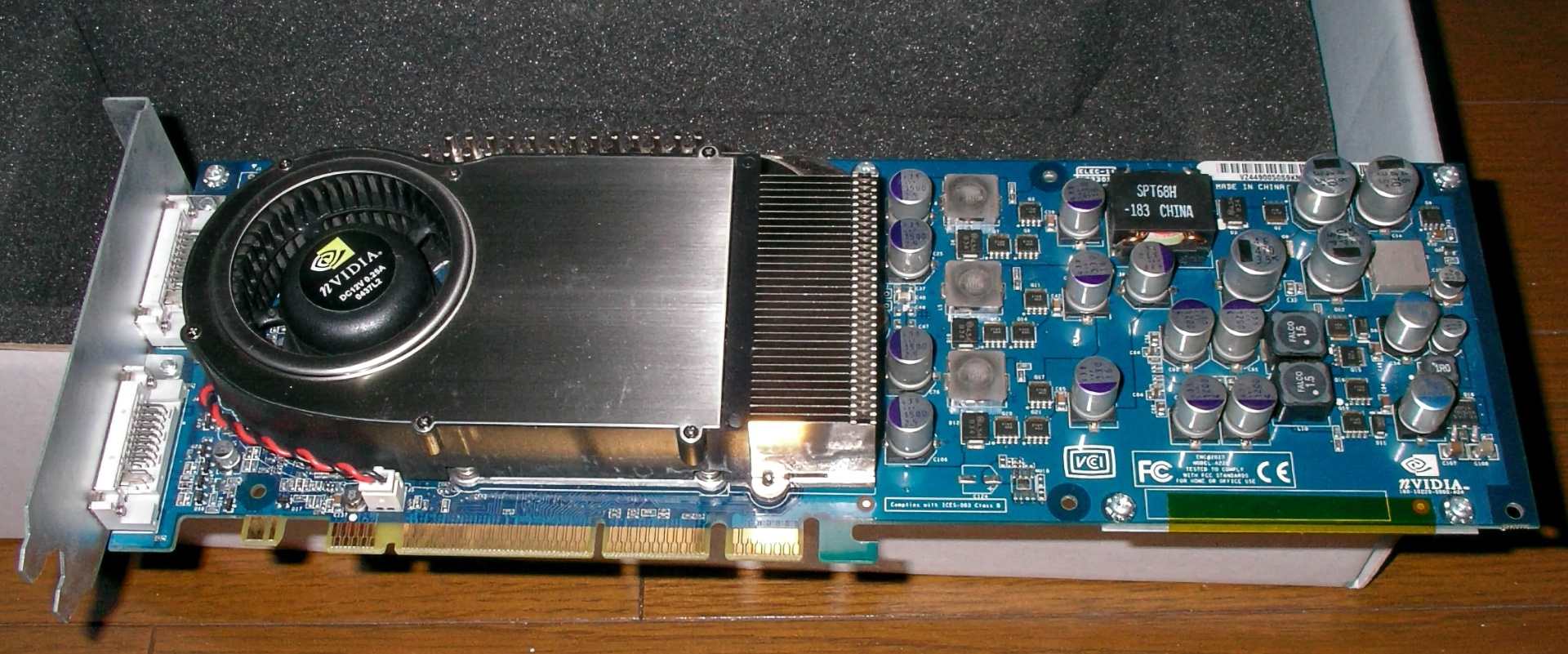
Apple Nvidia GeForce 6800 Ultra DDL 256MB AGP for Power Mac G5 M9593G/A

- June 2003: Initial release at speeds of Single 1.6, Single 1.8, Dual 2.0 GHz.
- November 2003: Dual 1.8 replaces Single 1.8 GHz; price reduction on Single 1.6 GHz.
- June 2004: 90 nm Dual 1.8, Dual 2.0 and Dual 2.5 GHz replace all previous models. The 2.5 GHz model is notable as the first major PC with liquid cooling included as stock.
- October 2004: A new Single 1.8 reintroduced, with a slower, 600 MHz HyperTransport, PCI bus, based upon the iMac G5's architecture (U3lite and Shasta chips). Apple's official name for this machine is "Power Mac G5 (Late 2004)".
- April 2005: CPU speed increased: Dual 2.5 GHz → Dual 2.7 GHz (PCI-X, more reliable liquid cooling), Dual 2.0 GHz → Dual 2.3 GHz (PCI-X), Dual 1.8 GHz → Dual 2.0 GHz (PCI). Newly introduced features were the 16x dual-layer SuperDrives across the line and increased storage, up to 800 GB for the higher-end models. The 1.8 GHz Single was not modified.
- June–July 2005: The Single 1.8 model was discontinued in the United States and Europe.
- October 2005: Shift to dual-core processors: Dual 2.0 GHz → DC 2.0 GHz, Dual 2.3 GHz → DC 2.3 GHz, Dual 2.7 GHz → Dual DC 2.5 GHz (termed a Quad Power Mac G5, with four CPU execution cores), all with DDR2 memory, and PCI Express expansion in place of PCI-X. The older PCI-X, Dual 2.7 GHz model remained available for a while, but the slower speed single-core models were discontinued immediately.
- August 2006: The Power Mac is replaced by its Intel successor, the Mac Pro.

== Technical specifications ==
According to Apple, all of these models are obsolete. (Note: Apple products that have been discontinued for 7 years and no longer receive hardware support or spare parts)

Model		Mid 2003				Late 2004					Early 2005			Late 2005		
Codename		"Omega, Q37"				"Niagara, Q77, Q78"					—N/a			"Cypher"		
Timetable	Released	June 23, 2003			November 18, 2003	June 9, 2004				October 19, 2004	April 27, 2005			October 19, 2005		
Timetable	Discontinued	June 9, 2004	November 18, 2003	June 9, 2004		April 27, 2005				June 13, 2005	October 19, 2005			August 7, 2006		
Model	Model number	A1047								A1093	A1047			A1117		
Model	Model identifier	PowerMac7,2				PowerMac7,3				PowerMac9,1	PowerMac7,3			PowerMac11,2		
Model	Order number	M9020	M9031	M9032	M9393	M9494	M9454	M9455	M9457	M9555	M9747	M9748	M9749	M9590	M9591	M9592
Performance	Processor	Single PowerPC 970 (G5)		Dual PowerPC 970 (G5)		Dual PowerPC 970FX (G5)				Single PowerPC 970FX (G5)	Dual PowerPC 970FX (G5)			Single Dual-core PowerPC 970MP (G5)		Two Dual-core ("Quad-core") PowerPC 970MP (G5)
Performance	Clock speed	1.6 GHz	1.8 GHz	2.0 GHz	1.8 GHz			2.0 GHz	2.5 GHz	1.8 GHz	2.0 GHz	2.3 GHz	2.7 GHz	2.0 GHz	2.3 GHz	2.5 GHz
Performance	Cache	64 KB (instruction), 32 KB (data) L1, 512 KB L2												64 KB (instruction), 32 KB (data) L1, 1.0 MB L2 per core		
Performance	HyperTransport	800, 900, Dual 900 MHz, or Dual 1 GHz (2:1)				Dual 900 MHz, Dual 1, or Dual 1.25 GHz (2:1)				600 MHz (3:1)	Dual 1 GHz (2:1)	Dual 1.15 GHz (2:1)	Dual 1.35 GHz (2:1)	Dual 1 GHz (2:1)	Dual 1.15 GHz (2:1)	Dual 1.25 GHz (2:1)
Memory	Amount	256 MB	512 MB			256 MB		512 MB		256 MB	512 MB					
Memory	Type	PC-2700 DDR SDRAM	PC-3200 DDR SDRAM			PC-2700 DDR SDRAM	PC-3200 DDR SDRAM							PC2-4200 DDR2 SDRAM		
Memory	Maximum	Expandable to 4 GB	Expandable to 8 GB			Expandable to 4 GB		Expandable to 8 GB		Expandable to 4 GB		Expandable to 8 GB		Expandable to 16 GB		
Graphics	Type	NVIDIA GeForceFX 5200 Ultra, GeForce 6800 Ultra DDL, ATI Radeon 9600 Pro, or Radeon 9800 Pro				NVIDIA GeForceFX 5200 Ultra			ATI Radeon 9600 XT	NVIDIA GeForceFX 5200 Ultra	ATI Radeon 9600		ATI Radeon 9650	NVIDIA GeForce 6600 LE	NVIDIA GeForce 6600	
Graphics	VRAM	64, 128, or 256 MB DDR RAM				64 MB DDR RAM			128 MB DDR RAM	64 MB DDR RAM	128 MB DDR RAM		256 MB DDR RAM	128 MB GDDR RAM	256 MB GDDR RAM	
Storage	Hard drive	80 GB Serial ATA 7200-rpm	160 GB Serial ATA 7200-rpm			80 GB Serial ATA 7200-rpm		160 GB Serial ATA 7200-rpm		80 GB Serial ATA 7200-rpm	160 GB Serial ATA 7200-rpm	250 GB Serial ATA 7200-rpm		160 GB Serial ATA 7200-rpm	250 GB Serial ATA 7200-rpm	
Storage	Optical drive	4x SuperDrive 4x/8x/16x/8x/32x DVD-R/CD-RW				8x SuperDrive 8x/10x/24x/10x/32x DVD-R/CD-RW					16x SuperDrive DVD+R DL/DVD±RW/CD-RW					
Peripherals	Connectivity	Optional AirPort Extreme 802.11b/g (external antenna); Gigabit Ethernet; 56k V.92 modem Optional on Late 2004 model Optional Bluetooth 1.1									Optional AirPort Extreme 802.11b/g (external antenna); Gigabit Ethernet; Optional 56k V.92 modem Optional Bluetooth 2.0+EDR			Optional AirPort Extreme 802.11b/g (internal antenna) with Bluetooth 2.0+EDR card 2x Gigabit Ethernet; Optional 56k V.92 USB modem		
Peripherals	Expansion slots	3x 33 MHz 64-bit PCI; 1x 8x AGP Pro (1.6 GHz)				3x 33 MHz 64-bit PCI; 1x 8x AGP Pro (1.8 GHz)				3x 33 MHz 64-bit PCI; 1x 8x AGP Pro	3x 33 MHz 64-bit PCI; 1x 8x AGP Pro (2.0 GHz)			2x PCI Express x4 1x PCI Express x8 1x PCI Express x16		
Peripherals	Expansion slots	2x 100 MHz 64-bit PCI-X; 1x 133 MHz 64-bit PCI-X; 1x 8x AGP Pro (1.8 GHz single+)				2x 100 MHz 64-bit PCI-X; 1x 133 MHz 64-bit PCI-X; 1x 8x AGP Pro (2.0 GHz+)				3x 33 MHz 64-bit PCI; 1x 8x AGP Pro	2x 100 MHz 64-bit PCI-X; 1x 133 MHz 64-bit PCI-X; 1x 8x AGP Pro (2.3 GHz)			2x PCI Express x4 1x PCI Express x8 1x PCI Express x16		
Peripherals	Peripherals	3x USB 2.0; 2x FireWire 400; 1x FireWire 800; Built-in mono speaker 1x Audio-in mini-jack 2x Audio-out mini-jack 1x Optical S/PDIF (Toslink) input 1x Optical S/PDIF (Toslink) output												4x USB 2.0; 2x FireWire 400; 1x FireWire 800; Built-in mono speaker 1x Audio-in mini-jack 2x Audio-out mini-jack 1x Optical S/PDIF (Toslink) input 1x Optical S/PDIF (Toslink) output		
Operating System	Original	Mac OS X 10.2.7 "Jaguar"				Mac OS X 10.3.4 "Panther"				Mac OS X 10.3.5 "Panther"	Mac OS X 10.4 "Tiger"			Mac OS X 10.4.2 "Tiger"		
Operating System	Maximum	Mac OS X 10.5.8 "Leopard"														
Weight		39.2 lb (17.8 kg)				44.4 lb (20.1 kg)				36 lb (16 kg)	44.4 lb (20.1 kg)			44.5–48.8 lb (20.2–22.1 kg)		

== Defects ==
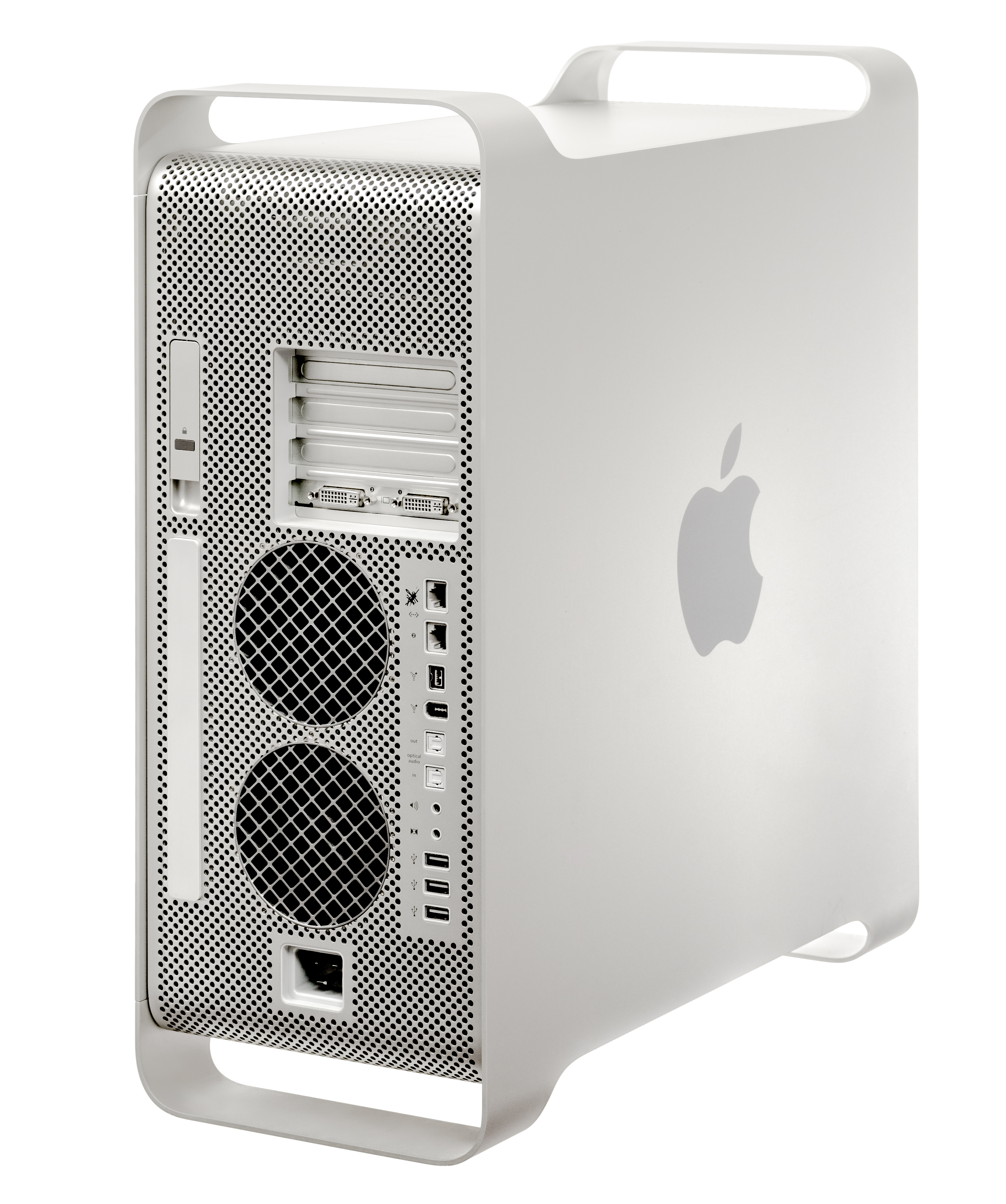
The back of a late 2005 model.

Early versions of dual processor G5 computers have noise problems. The first one is ground loop-based interference, which sometimes causes noise leaks into the analog audio outputs. This bug was fixed in Rev. B G5.

The second noise problem came from the 'chirping' sound, which can be triggered by fluctuations in power draw. For example, using Exposé causes a brief chirp. A widely circulated work-around is to disable the CPUs' "nap" feature using Apple's CHUD Tools, but this was not recommended by Apple. This noise problem was not fixed until the dual core generation of G5s was produced, however it did not affect the "Late 2004" model (at least there have never been any reports). The power draw fluctuation was later attributed to the lack of power management features in the single-core processors. Apple eventually posted the chirping bug information on its support site.

Although the noise problems did not prevent the affected computers from working, they were problematic for audio professionals and enthusiasts, especially for the liquid-cooled models, which had been expressly designed as mechanically quiet for discerning listeners.

A common problem among single processor G5s was the cyclic expansion and contraction of a metal plate soldered to the Logic Board connecting all eight of the RAM slots. Eventually, this can cause the computer to no longer detect the RAM, and refuse to boot. Fixes for this include having the plate re-soldered, or exposing the other side of the Logic Board to heat from a heat gun. The latter option is far easier, since it requires neither soldering nor the removal of the Logic Board from the computer.

All 2.5 GHz and 2.7 GHz dual processor models and the 2.5 GHz quad-processor model had a liquid cooling system that consisted of a radiator, coolant pump, and heat exchangers bolted to the processors. The cooling system was made by Delphi Automotive, a former Harrison Radiator Division of General Motors. This was a bold step for Apple, and should have allowed the use of very fast processors, giving Apple an advantage in both performance and reliability, but the system turned out to be subject to coolant leakage, made worse by the system's use of GM Dexcool coolant, which is more corrosive than regular automotive coolant. If not caught in time, the leakage could destroy the processors, logic board, power supply unit, and even corrode the aluminum casing itself. While leakage was sometimes detectable by drops of green coolant in or beneath the machine, in many machines the seepage is so slight that it was almost impossible to detect without dismantling the entire computer. Only the 2.7 GHz model was equipped with a Panasonic liquid cooling system which was much more reliable.

The liquid cooling system fits into the case where the heat sinks would normally go, so there is no easy way to distinguish the liquid-cooled versions from the air-cooled, although most, but not all, of the liquid-cooled machines have a sticker inside warning about the possibility of leakage.

== Supported operating systems ==
Supported macOS releases
OS release	Mid 2003	Late 2004	Early 2005	Late 2005
10.2 Jaguar	10.2.7	—N/a	—N/a	—N/a
10.3 Panther	Yes	10.3.4	—N/a	—N/a
10.4 Tiger	Yes	Yes	Yes	10.4.2
10.5 Leopard (Note: Mac OS X Leopard is the final release to support PowerPC Macs.)	Yes	Yes	Yes	Yes

== Timeline ==
Timeline of Power Macintosh models
See also: List of Mac models

== See also ==
- List of Macintosh models grouped by CPU type
