= System G =

System G may refer to:

== Technology ==
- System G (supercomputer), a cluster supercomputer at Virginia Tech
- CCIR System G, a 625-line analog television transmission format
