= Power five (disambiguation) =

Power five or Power 5 may refer to:

- Fist bump, a social gesture
- POWER5, a microprocessor by IBM
- Power Five conferences, a group of American university athletic conferences
