= IBM ViVA =

VIVA (Virtual Vector Architecture) is a technology from IBM for coupling together multiple scalar floating point units to act as a single vector processor. Certain computing tasks are more efficiently handled through vector computations where an instruction can be applied to multiple elements simultaneously, rather than the scalar approach where one instruction is applied to one piece of data at a time. This kind of technology is highly sought after for scientific computing and is IBM's answer to the vector-based supercomputers pioneered by Cray and that was the basis for NEC's Earth Simulator which was the fastest supercomputer in the world 2002-2004.

ViVA was developed and implemented by IBM together with National Energy Research Scientific Computing Center inside the Blue Planet project where they had 8 dual core POWER5 processors made into one vector processor capable of approximately 60-80 GFLOPS of computing power. ViVA technology is in use in the ASC Purple supercomputer.

Where ViVA was a software implementation in high-end POWER5 based systems, the second generation, VIVA-2, is directly supported by hardware in the POWER6 processor.
