= System G (supercomputer) =

Cluster supercomputer at Virginia Tech

System G was a cluster supercomputer at Virginia Tech consisting of 324 Apple Mac Pro computers with a total of 2592 processing cores. It was finished in November 2008 and ranked 279 in that month's edition of TOP500, running at 16.78 teraflops and peaking at 22.94 teraflops. It ran at a "sustained (Linpack) performance of 22.8 TFlops". It transmitted data between nodes over Gigabit Ethernet and 40 Gbit/s Infiniband.

== Mac Pro nodes ==
Each of the 324 Mac Pro machines contained two quad-core 2.8 GHz Xeon processors and 8 gigabytes of RAM.

== Namesake ==
System G's name stemmed from its homage to System X and to its focus on green computing—the cluster has thousands of power and thermal sensors to test high performance computing at low power requirements and was, at the time, the largest power-aware research system in the world.
