= System X (supercomputer) =

2003 supercomputer at Virginia Tech

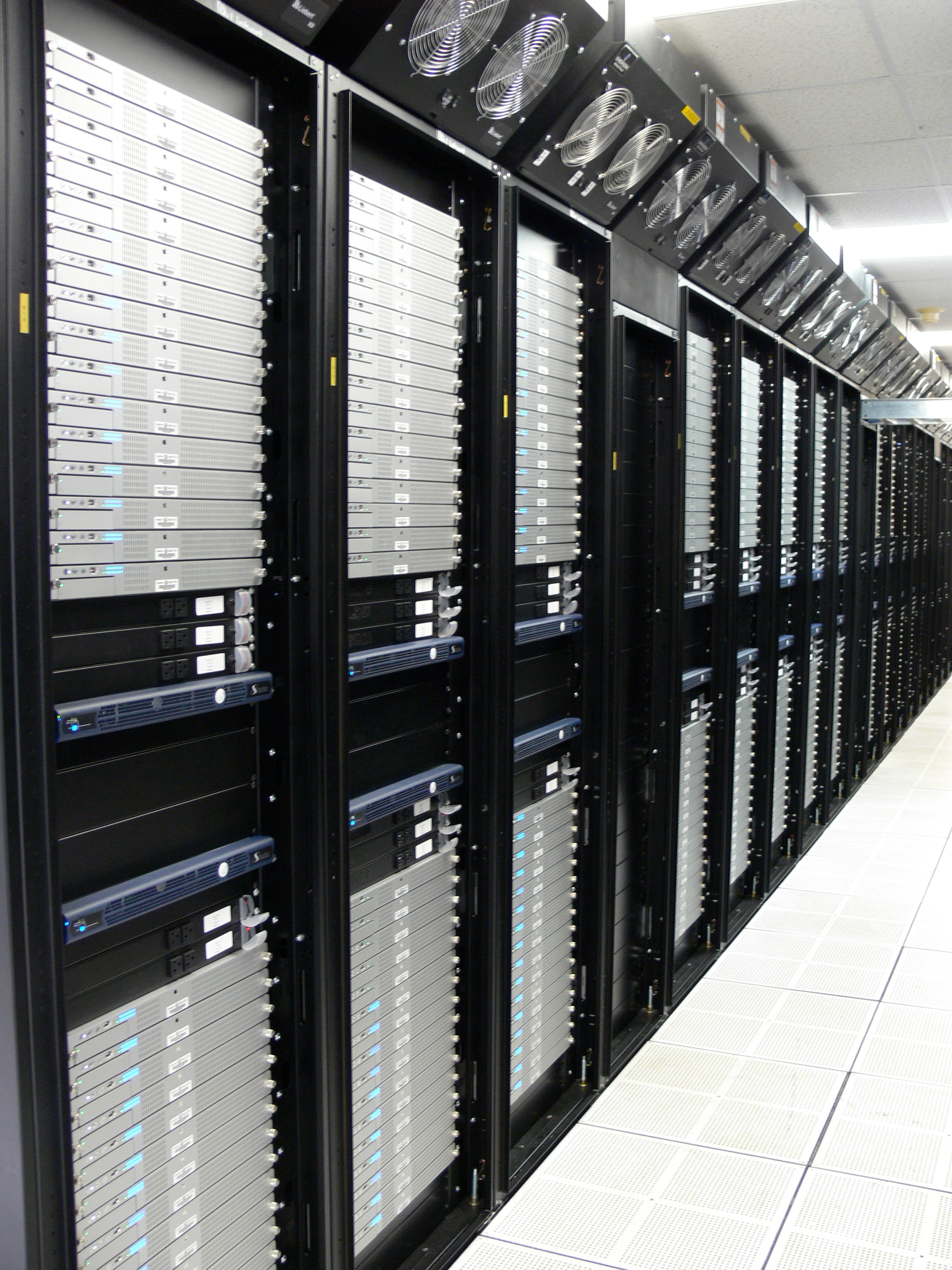
Xserve cluster System X at Virginia Tech

System X (pronounced "System Ten") was a supercomputer assembled by Virginia Tech's Advanced Research Computing facility in the summer of 2003. Costing US$5.2 million, it was originally composed of 1,100 Apple Power Mac G5 computers with dual 2.0 GHz processors. System X was decommissioned on May 21, 2012. The supercomputer is also known as Big Mac or Terascale Cluster.

System X ran at 12.25 Teraflops, (20.24 peak), and was ranked #3 on November 16, 2003 and #280 in the July 2008 edition of the TOP500 list of the world's most powerful supercomputers. The system used error-correcting (ECC) RAM, which is important for accuracy due to the rate of bits flipped by cosmic rays or other interference sources in its vast number of RAM chips.

== Background ==
The supercomputer's name originates from the use of the Mac OS X operating system for each node, and because it was the first university computer to achieve 10 teraflops on the high performance LINPACK benchmark. In 2003 it was also touted as "the world's most powerful and cheapest homebuilt supercomputer." System X was constructed with a relatively low budget of just $5.2 million, in the span of only three months, thanks in large part to using off-the-shelf Power Mac G5 computers. By comparison, the Earth Simulator, the fastest supercomputer at the time, cost approximately $400 million to build.

== Upgrade to Server-Grade Parts ==
In 2004, Virginia Tech upgraded its computer to Apple's newly released, Xserve G5 servers. The upgraded version ranked #7 in the 2004 TOP500 list and its server-grade error-correcting memory solved the problem of cosmic ray interference. In October 2004, Virginia Tech partially rebuilt System X at a cost of about $600,000. These improvements brought the computer's speed up to 12.25 Teraflops, which placed System X #14 on the 2005 TOP500 list.

== Similar Projects ==
Virginia Tech's system was the model for Xseed, a smaller system also made from Xserve servers and built by Bowie State University in Maryland. Xseed was ranked #166 in the 2005 TOP500.

System G has 324 Mac Pros (2592 processor cores) with QDR InfiniBand in Virginia Tech's Center for High-End Computing Systems.

== See also ==
- History of supercomputing
