= POWER4 =

2001 family of microprocessors by IBM

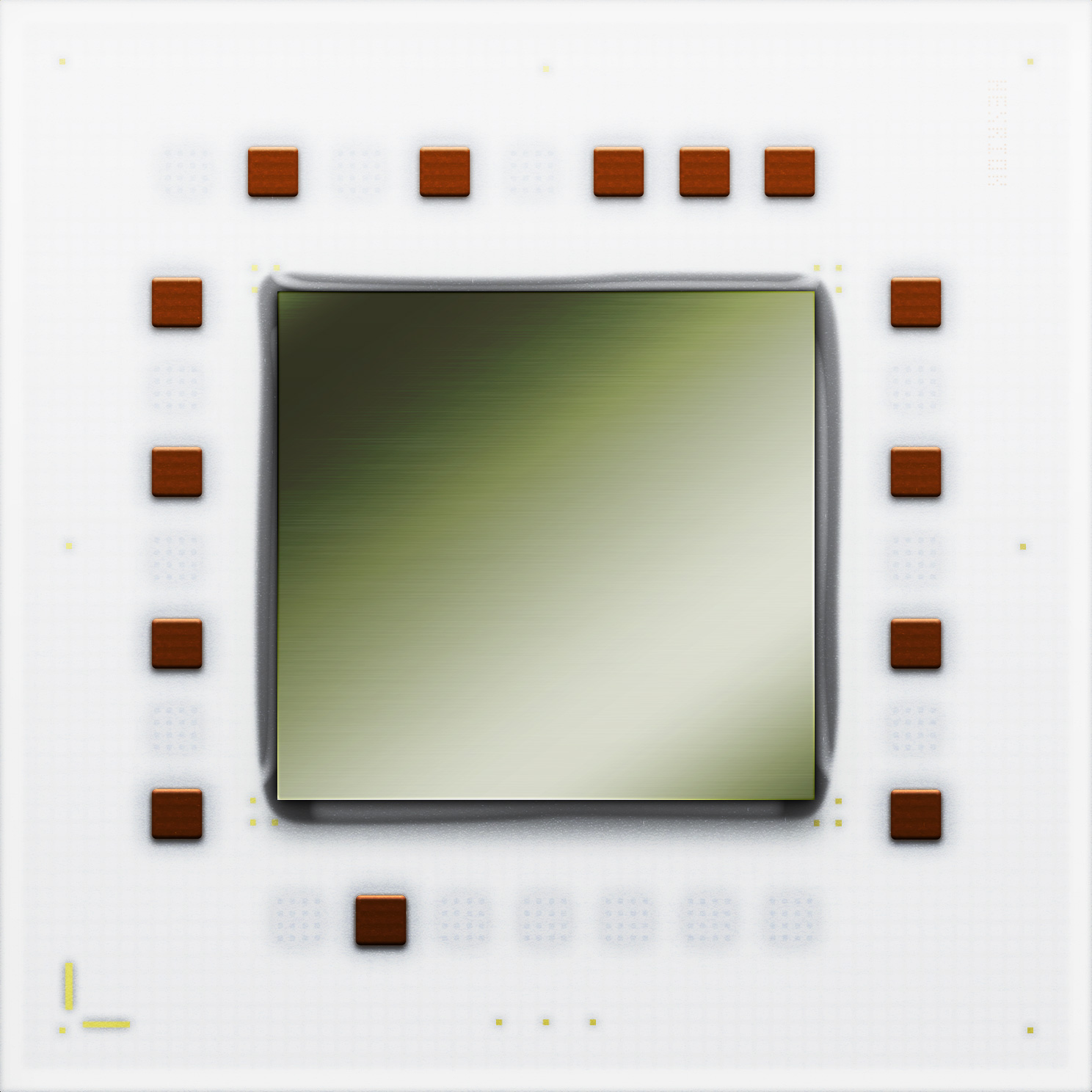
- POWER4 SCM

General information
- Launched: 2001
- Designed by: IBM

Performance
- Max. CPU clock rate: 1.1 GHz to 1.9 GHz

Cache
- L1 cache: 64+32 kB/core
- L2 cache: 1.41 MB/chip
- L3 cache: 32 MB off chip

Architecture and classification
- Technology node: 180 nm to 130 nm
- Instruction set: PowerPC (PowerPC v.2.00/01)

Physical specifications
- Cores: 2

History
- Predecessors: POWER3, RS64
- Successor: POWER5

The POWER4 is a microprocessor developed by International Business Machines (IBM) that implemented the 64-bit PowerPC and PowerPC AS instruction set architectures. Released in 2001, the POWER4 succeeded the POWER3 and RS64 microprocessors, enabling RS/6000 and eServer iSeries models of AS/400 computer servers to run on the same processor, as a step toward converging the two lines. The POWER4 was a multicore microprocessor, with two cores on a single die, the first non-embedded microprocessor to do so. POWER4 Chip was first commercially available multiprocessor chip. The original POWER4 had a clock speed of 1.1 and 1.3 GHz, while an enhanced version, the POWER4+, reached a clock speed of 1.9 GHz. The PowerPC 970 is a derivative of the POWER4.

== Functional layout ==
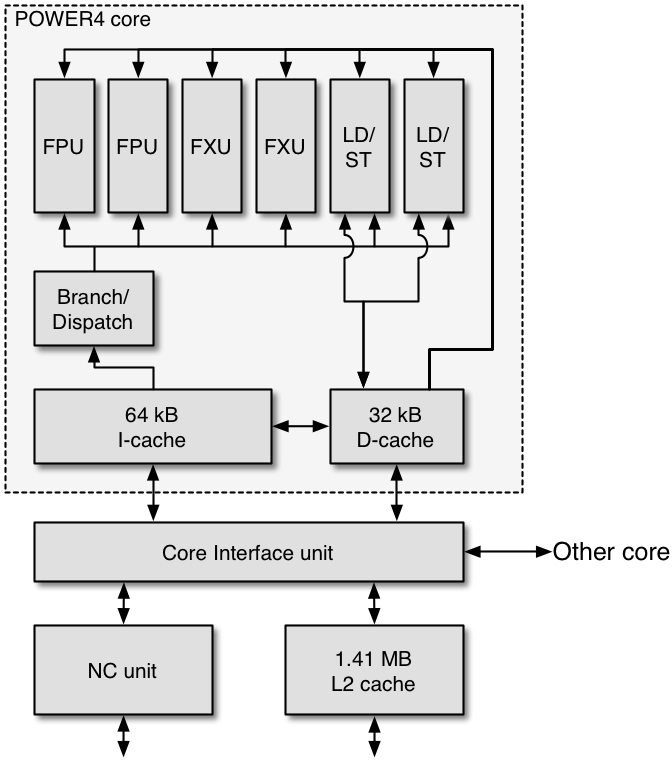
The logic schema of the POWER4 core

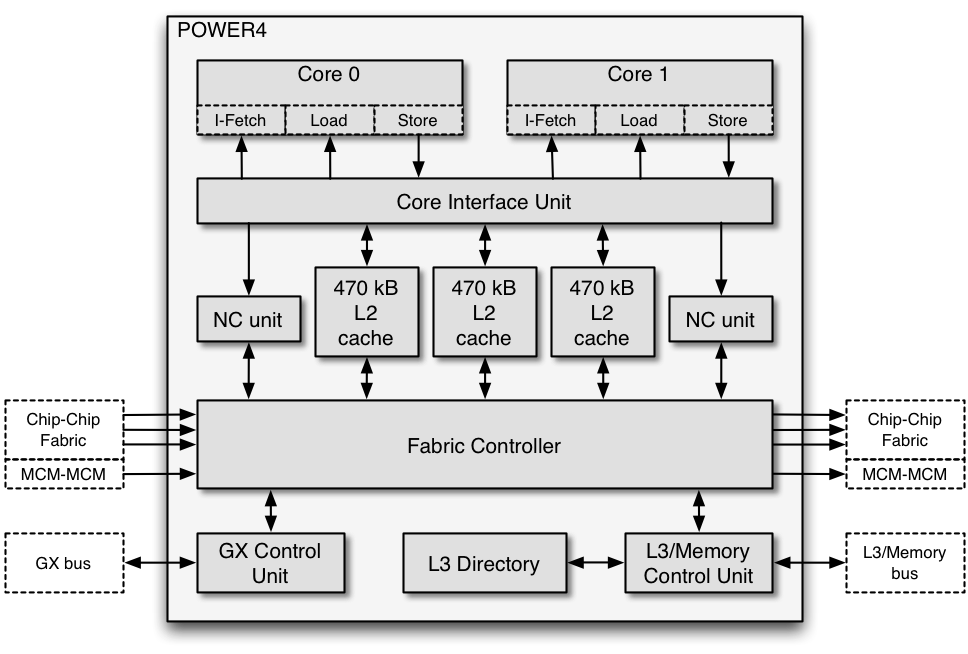
The logic schema of the POWER4 processor

The POWER4 has a unified L2 cache, divided into three equal parts. Each has its own independent L2 controller which can feed 32 bytes of data per cycle. The Core Interface Unit (CIU) connects each L2 controller to either the data cache or instruction cache in either of the two processors. The Non-Cacheable (NC) Unit is responsible for handling instruction serializing functions and performing any noncacheable operations in the storage topology. There is an L3 cache controller, but the actual memory is off-chip. The GX bus controller controls I/O device communications, and there are two 4-byte wide GX buses, one incoming and the other outgoing. The Fabric Controller is the master controller for the network of buses, controlling communications for both L1/L2 controllers, communications between POWER4 chips {4-way, 8-way, 16-way, 32-way} and POWER4 MCM's. Trace-and-Debug, used for First Failure Data Capture, is provided. There is also a Built In Self Test function (BIST) and Performance Monitoring Unit (PMU). Power-on reset (POR) is supported.

=== Execution units ===
The POWER4 implements a superscalar microarchitecture through high-frequency speculative out-of-order execution using eight independent execution units. They are: two floating-point units (FP1-2), two load-store units (LD1-2), two fixed-point units (FX1-2), a branch unit (BR), and a conditional-register unit (CR). These execution units can complete up to eight operations per clock (not including the BR and CR units):

- each floating point unit can complete one fused multiply–add per clock (two operations),
- each load–store unit can complete one instruction per clock,
- each fixed-point unit can complete one instruction per clock.

The pipeline stages are:

- Branch Prediction
- Instruction Fetch
- Decode, Crack and Group Formation
- Group Dispatch and Instruction Issue
- Load–Store Unit Operation
  - Load Hit Store
  - Store Hit Load
  - Load Hit Load
- Instruction Execution Pipeline

== Multi-chip configuration ==
The POWER4 also came in a configuration using a multi-chip module (MCM) containing four POWER4 dies in a single package, with up to 128 MB of shared L3 ECC cache per MCM.

== Parametrics ==
POWER4 180 nm@CMOS 8S3 SOI
Clock GHz	1.3 GHz	
Power	115 W	1.5 V @ 1.1 GHz
Transistors		174 million
Gate L	90 nm	
Gate oxide		2.3 nm
Metal-layer	pitch	thickness
M1	500 nm	310 nm
M2	630 nm	310 nm
M3-M5	630 nm	20 nm
M6(MQ)	1260 nm	920 nm
M7(LM)	1260 nm	920 nm
Dielectric	~4.2	
Vdd	1.6 V	

== POWER4+ ==
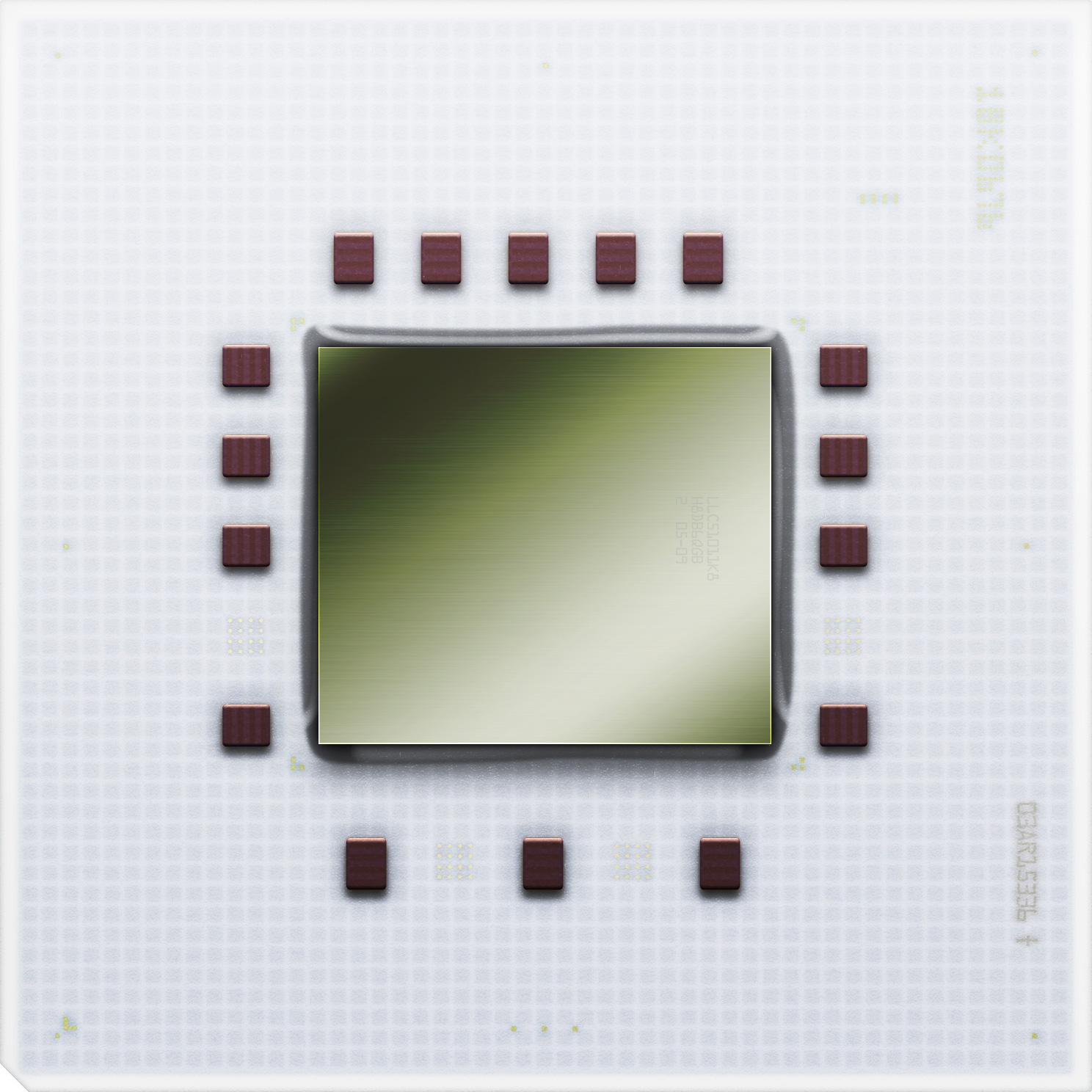
POWER4+ SCM

The POWER4+, released in 2003, was an improved version of the POWER4 that ran at up to 1.9 GHz. It contained 184 million transistors, measured 267 mm^{2}, and was fabricated in a 0.13 μm SOI CMOS process with eight layers of copper interconnect.

== See also ==
- PowerPC 970
- IBM Power microprocessors
