= Gogotsi =

Gogotsi (Ukrainian: Гогоці, Russian: Гогоци) is a gender-neutral Slavic surname that may refer to the following notable people:

- George Gogotsi (born 1930), Ukrainian materials scientist
- Yury Gogotsi (born 1961), Ukrainian materials scientist, son of George
