= George Gogotsi =

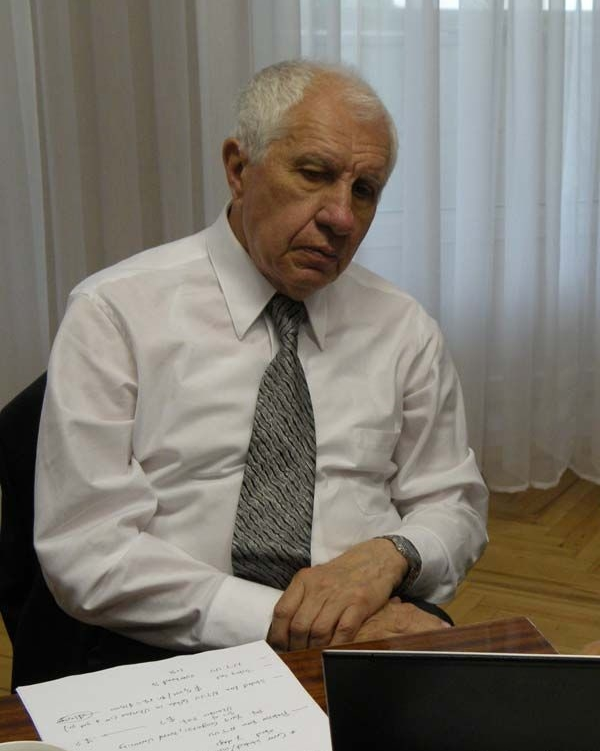
- Professor George Gogotsi
- Born: August 2, 1930 (age 96); Kyiv, Ukrainian SSR
- Other name: George Antonovych Gogotsi
- Occupation: Professor
- Employer(s): Pisarenko Institute for Problems of Strength, National Academy of Science of Ukraine; Materials Research Centre.
- Known for: fracture mechanics, solid mechanics

Geо́rge Antо́novych Gogо́tsi (born August 2, 1930, Kyiv, Ukrainian SSR) is a soviet Ukrainian scientist, professor of solid mechanics, doctor of science, and leading researcher of the Pisarenko Institute for Problems of Strength of the National Academy of Sciences of Ukraine.

He has two sons – Yury Gogotsi, world-known professor of chemistry, materials science and nanotechnology at Drexel University, USA, and Oleksiy Gogotsi – engineer and materials scientist, daughter – Helena Gogotsi, physicist and materials scientist.

== Research Interests ==
His main research interests are focused on behavior of ceramics single crystals, glass, refractories under mechanical and thermal fracture over a wide range of temperatures, and also on physical processes that control their deformation and fracturing at macro and micro levels.

== Education ==
1954 - M.S. in Mechanics, Kyiv Polytechnic Institute, Ukraine; 1966 - Ph.D. in Mechanics, Institute for Problems of Materials Science NAS USSR; 1986 - D.Sc. in Materials Engineering, Institute for Problems of Strengths, National Academy of Science of Ukraine; 1994 - Professor of Mechanics, National Academy of Sciences of Ukraine.

== Scientific and Research Contribution ==
At the beginning of his scientific work, Prof. G.A. Gogotsi investigated the processes of heat transfer, and then experimentally proved impossibility of creation of magnetohydrodynamic installations, intended for the direct conversion of thermal energy into electrical energy, which were of great interest in power engineering. He showed the practical impossibility of such transformation because of the lack of refractory materials that are operable at temperatures close to 3000 °C.

Further, he investigated the ceramic materials for nozzles of the rockets, for gas turbine and reciprocating engines, and also took part in the creation of the first Soviet tank gas turbine engine. He also studied the fracture resistance of ceramic armor, designed to protect people and equipment. A great deal of attention was paid to the research and creation of refractories, as well as zirconia ceramics for engineering and medicine.

He created ophthalmologic and medical super sharp scalpels from zirconium dioxide single crystals, which were used in clinics in Kyiv, Moscow, Melbourne and Sydney. He also investigated the resistance to fracture of layered and other brittle composite materials by their mechanical and thermal loading in a wide range of temperatures.

To conduct research, he developed new methods of mechanical testing and created experimental equipment (its originality is protected by more than 30 author's certificates of the former USSR), which were widely used in scientific practice. For example, equipment for determining the complex of mechanical characteristics of brittle materials in the interval -150–1500 °C, for testing the heat resistance of hollow cylindrical samples (heating to 2800 °C with a programmable rate of temperature change and laser measurement of sample expansion), a panel furnace for radiant heating, suitable for testing the load-bearing capacity of flat specimens, which was awarded a gold medal of the Exhibition of Economic Achievements of the USSR, etc. For the invention of the ceramic armor, breastplate he was awarded "The inventor of the USSR". This allowed him to conduct research at a high scientific and technical level and publish his results in international scientific journals even during the Iron Curtain time.

Professor George Gogotsi was the first scientist who introduced such concepts in applied material mechanics as a "brittleness measure", "base diagram", "R-line", "FR-method", "fracture barrier".

Also, he pays attention to the development of ceramic materials for engineering and medicine (protected by 10 author's certificates of the former USSR and patents of Ukraine). He is the author and co-author of more than 250 scientific publications in national and international journals, and his Hirsch index is 22 (Google Scholar), Scopus h-index = 17 (Author ID: 7006707350), according to the Web of Science database this index is h-index = 15 (ResearcherID: G-6331-2015) (ISI data base).
