= Chirp =

Frequency swept signal

A linear chirp waveform; a sinusoidal wave that increases in frequency linearly over time

A chirp is a signal in which the frequency varies with time, increasing (up-chirp) or decreasing (down-chirp). Some authors use the term chirp interchangeably with sweep signal. It is commonly applied to sonar, radar, and laser systems, and to other applications, such as in spread-spectrum communications (see chirp spread spectrum). The name is a reference to the chirping sound made by birds.

This signal occurs as a phenomenon due to dispersion (a non-linear dependence between frequency and the propagation speed of the wave components). It is usually compensated for by using a matched filter, which can be part of the propagation channel. Depending on the specific performance measure, however, there are better techniques both for radar and communication. Since it was used in radar and space, it has been adopted also for communication standards. For automotive radar applications, it is usually called linear frequency modulated waveform (LFMW).

In spread-spectrum usage, surface acoustic wave (SAW) devices are often used to generate and demodulate the chirped signals. In optics, ultrashort laser pulses also exhibit chirp, which, in optical transmission systems, interacts with the dispersion properties of the materials, increasing or decreasing total pulse dispersion as the signal propagates.

== Definitions ==
The basic definitions here translate as the common physics quantities location (phase), speed (angular velocity), acceleration (chirpyness). If a waveform is defined as:
$$x(t) = \sin\left(\phi(t)\right)$$

then the instantaneous angular frequency, ω, is defined as the phase rate as given by the first derivative of phase, with the instantaneous ordinary frequency, f, being its normalized version:
$$\omega(t) = \frac{d\phi(t)}{dt}, \,
f(t) = \frac{\omega(t)}{2\pi}$$

Finally, the instantaneous angular chirpyness (symbol γ) is defined to be the second derivative of instantaneous phase or the first derivative of instantaneous angular frequency,
$$\gamma(t) = \frac{d^2\phi(t)}{dt^2} = \frac{d\omega(t)}{dt}$$
Angular chirpyness has units of radians per square second (rad/s^{2}); thus, it is analogous to angular acceleration.

The instantaneous ordinary chirpyness (symbol c) is a normalized version, defined as the rate of change of the instantaneous frequency:
$$c(t) = \frac{\gamma(t)}{2\pi} = \frac{df(t)}{dt}$$
Ordinary chirpyness has units of square reciprocal seconds (s^{−2}); thus, it is analogous to rotational acceleration.

== Types ==
=== Linear ===
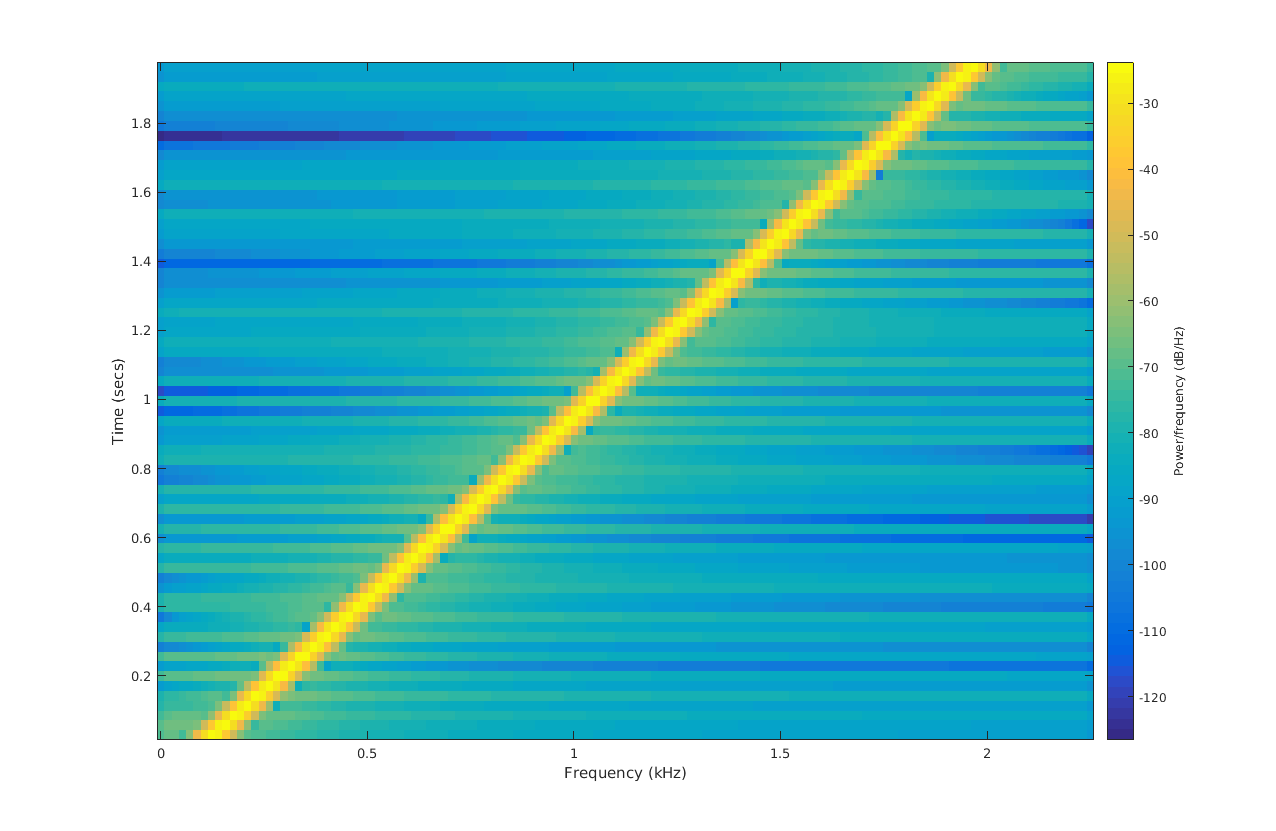
Spectrogram of a linear chirp. The spectrogram plot demonstrates the linear rate of change in frequency as a function of time, in this case from 0 to 7 kHz, repeating every 2.3 seconds. The intensity of the plot is proportional to the energy content in the signal at the indicated frequency and time.

Linear chirp
Sound example for linear chirp (five repetitions)

In a linear-frequency chirp or simply linear chirp, the instantaneous frequency $f(t)$ varies exactly linearly with time:
$$f(t) = c t + f_0,$$
where $f_0$ is the starting frequency (at time $t = 0$) and $c$ is the chirp rate, assumed constant:
$$c = \frac{f_1 - f_0}{T} = \frac{\Delta f}{\Delta t}.$$

Here, $f_1$ is the final frequency and $T$ is the time it takes to sweep from $f_0$ to $f_1$.

The corresponding time-domain function for the phase of any oscillating signal is the integral of the frequency function, as one expects the phase to grow like $\phi(t + \Delta t) \simeq \phi(t) + 2\pi f(t)\,\Delta t$, i.e., that the derivative of the phase is the angular frequency $\phi'(t) = 2\pi\,f(t)$.

For the linear chirp, this results in:
$$\begin{align}
\phi(t) &= \phi_0 + 2\pi\int_0^t f(\tau)\, d\tau\\
&= \phi_0 + 2\pi\int_0^t \left(c \tau+f_0\right)\, d\tau\\
&= \phi_0 + 2\pi         \left(\frac{c}{2} t^2+f_0 t\right),
\end{align}$$

where $\phi_0$ is the initial phase (at time $t = 0$). Thus this is also called a quadratic-phase signal.

The corresponding time-domain function for a sinusoidal linear chirp is the sine of the phase in radians:
$$x(t) = \sin\left[\phi_0 + 2\pi \left(\frac{c}{2} t^2 + f_0 t \right) \right]$$

=== Exponential ===
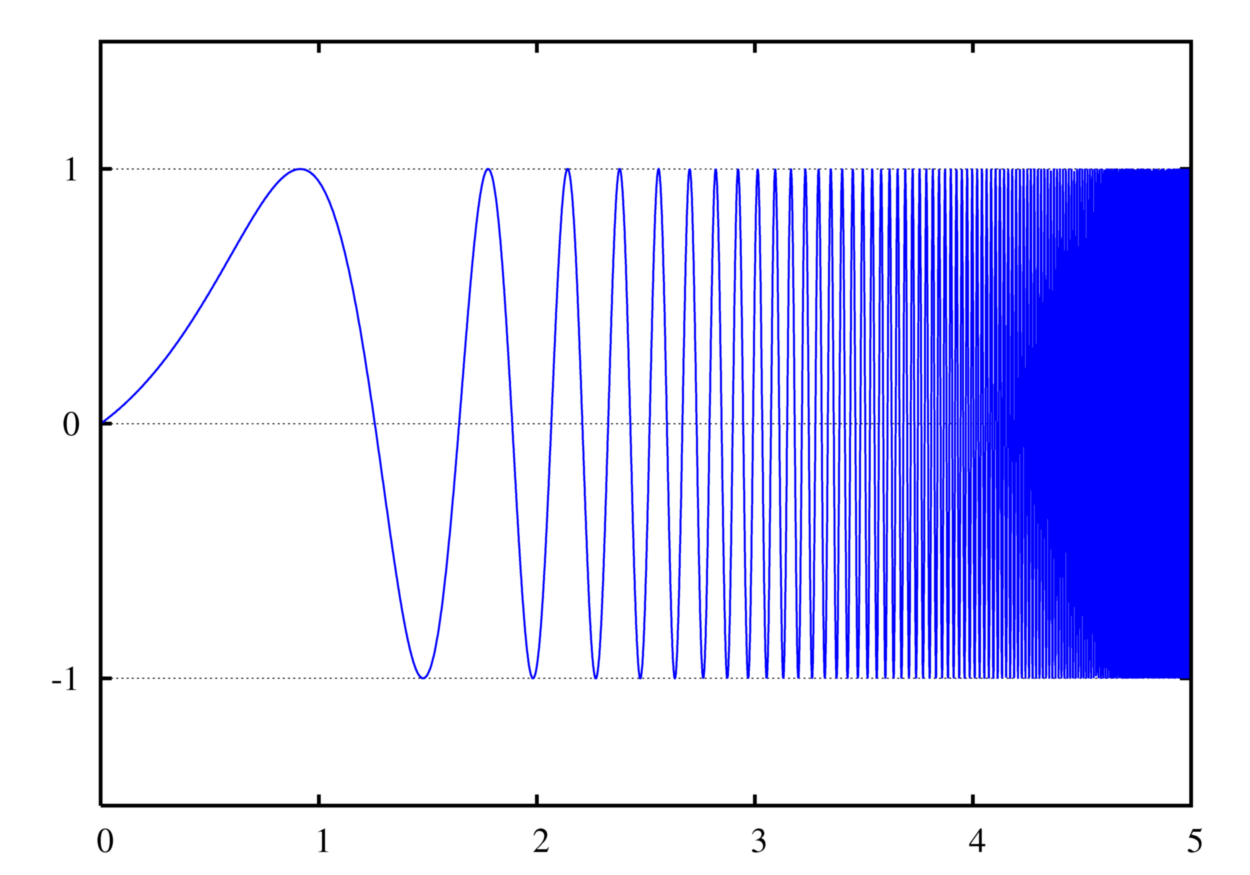
An exponential chirp waveform; a sinusoidal wave that increases in frequency exponentially over time

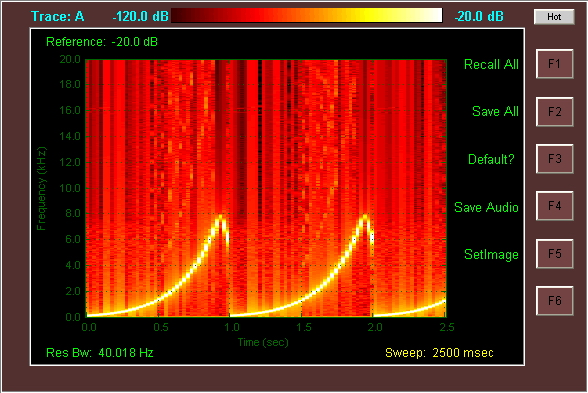
Spectrogram of an exponential chirp. The exponential rate of change of frequency is shown as a function of time, in this case from nearly 0 up to 8 kHz repeating every second. Also visible in this spectrogram is a frequency fallback to 6 kHz after peaking, likely an artifact of the specific method employed to generate the waveform.

Exponential chirp
Sound example for exponential chirp (five repetitions)

In a geometric chirp, also called an exponential chirp, the frequency of the signal varies with a geometric relationship over time. In other words, if two points in the waveform are chosen, $t_1$ and $t_2$, and the time interval between them $T = t_2 - t_1$ is kept constant, the frequency ratio $f\left(t_2\right)/f\left(t_1\right)$ will also be constant.

In an exponential chirp, the frequency of the signal varies exponentially as a function of time:
$$f(t) = f_0 k^\frac{t}{T}$$
where $f_0$ is the starting frequency (at $t = 0$), and $k$ is the rate of exponential change in frequency.

$$k = \frac{f_1}{f_0}$$

Where $f_1$ is the ending frequency of the chirp (at $t = T$).

Unlike the linear chirp, which has a constant chirpyness, an exponential chirp has an exponentially increasing frequency rate.

The corresponding time-domain function for the phase of an exponential chirp is the integral of the frequency:
$$\begin{align}
\phi(t)
&= \phi_0 + 2\pi     \int_0^t f(\tau)\, d\tau \\
&= \phi_0 + 2\pi f_0 \int_0^t k^\frac{\tau}{T} d\tau \\
&= \phi_0 + 2\pi f_0 \left(\frac{T \left(k^\frac{t}{T}-1\right)}{\ln(k)}\right)
\end{align}$$
where $\phi_0$ is the initial phase (at $t = 0$).

The corresponding time-domain function for a sinusoidal exponential chirp is the sine of the phase in radians:
$$x(t) = \sin\left[\phi_0 + 2\pi f_0 \left(\frac{T \left(k^\frac{t}{T}-1\right)}{\ln(k)}\right) \right]$$

As was the case for the Linear Chirp, the instantaneous frequency of the Exponential Chirp consists of the fundamental frequency $f(t) = f_0 k^\frac{t}{T}$ accompanied by additional harmonics.

=== Hyperbolic ===
Hyperbolic chirps are used in radar applications, as they show maximum matched filter response after being distorted by the Doppler effect.

In a hyperbolic chirp, the frequency of the signal varies hyperbolically as a function of time:
$$f(t) = \frac{f_0 f_1 T}{(f_0-f_1)t+f_1T}$$

The corresponding time-domain function for the phase of a hyperbolic chirp is the integral of the frequency:
$$\begin{align}
\phi(t)
&= \phi_0 + 2\pi     \int_0^t f(\tau)\, d\tau \\
&= \phi_0 + 2\pi \frac{-f_0 f_1 T}{f_1-f_0} \ln\left(1-\frac{f_1-f_0}{f_1T}t\right)
\end{align}$$
where $\phi_0$ is the initial phase (at $t = 0$).

The corresponding time-domain function for a sinusoidal hyperbolic chirp is the sine of the phase in radians:
$$x(t) = \sin\left[ \phi_0 + 2\pi \frac{-f_0 f_1 T}{f_1-f_0} \ln\left(1-\frac{f_1-f_0}{f_1T}t\right)\right]$$

== Generation ==
A chirp signal can be generated with analog circuitry via a voltage-controlled oscillator (VCO), and a linearly or exponentially ramping control voltage. It can also be generated digitally by a digital signal processor (DSP) and digital-to-analog converter (DAC), using a direct digital synthesizer (DDS) and by varying the step in the numerically controlled oscillator. It can also be generated by a YIG oscillator.

== Relation to an impulse signal ==
Chirp and impulse signals and their (selected) spectral components. On the bottom given four monochromatic components, sine waves of different frequency. The red line in the waves give the relative phase shift to the other sine waves, originating from the chirp characteristic. The animation removes the phase shift step by step (like with matched filtering), resulting in a sinc pulse when no relative phase shift is left.

A chirp signal shares the same spectral content with an impulse signal. However, unlike in the impulse signal, spectral components of the chirp signal have different phases, i.e., their power spectra are alike but the phase spectra are distinct. Dispersion of a signal propagation medium may result in unintentional conversion of impulse signals into chirps (whistler). On the other hand, many practical applications, such as chirped pulse amplifiers or echolocation systems, use chirp signals instead of impulses because of their inherently lower peak-to-average power ratio (PAPR).

== Uses and occurrences ==
=== Chirp modulation ===
Chirp modulation, or linear frequency modulation for digital communication, was patented by Sidney Darlington in 1954 with significant later work performed by Winkler in 1962. This type of modulation employs sinusoidal waveforms whose instantaneous frequency increases or decreases linearly over time. These waveforms are commonly referred to as linear chirps or simply chirps.

Hence the rate at which their frequency changes is called the chirp rate. In binary chirp modulation, binary data is transmitted by mapping the bits into chirps of opposite chirp rates. For instance, over one bit period "1" is assigned a chirp with positive rate a and "0" a chirp with negative rate −a. Chirps have been heavily used in radar applications and as a result advanced sources for transmission and matched filters for reception of linear chirps are available.

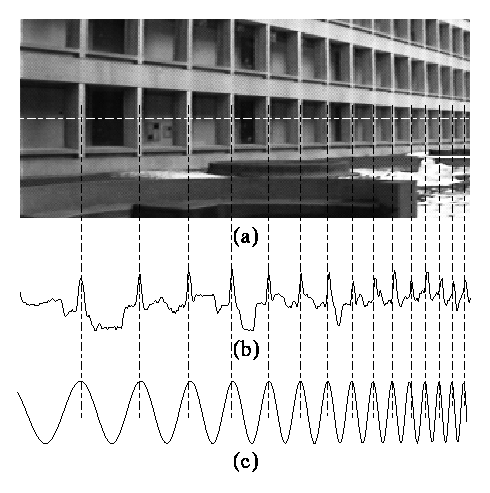
(a) In image processing, direct periodicity seldom occurs, but, rather, periodicity-in-perspective is encountered. (b) Repeating structures like the alternating dark space inside the windows, and light space of the white concrete, "chirp" (increase in frequency) towards the right. (c) Thus the best fit chirp for image processing is often a projective chirp.

=== Chirplet transform ===
Another kind of chirp is the projective chirp, of the form:
$$g = f\left[\frac{a \cdot x + b}{c \cdot x + 1}\right],$$
having the three parameters a (scale), b (translation), and c (chirpiness). The projective chirp is ideally suited to image processing, and forms the basis for the projective chirplet transform.

=== Key chirp ===
A change in frequency of Morse code from the desired frequency, due to poor stability in the RF oscillator, is known as chirp, and in the R-S-T system is given an appended letter 'C'.

== See also ==
- Chirp spectrum - Analysis of the frequency spectrum of chirp signals
- Chirp compression - Further information on compression techniques
- Chirp spread spectrum - A part of the wireless telecommunications standard IEEE 802.15.4a CSS
- Chirped mirror
- Chirped pulse amplification
- Chirplet transform - A signal representation based on a family of localized chirp functions.
- Continuous-wave radar
- Dispersion (optics)
- Pulse compression
- Radio propagation § Measuring HF propagation
