= Gas turbine engine compressors =

Engine component

Diagram of gas turbine with axial compressor

As the name suggests, gas turbine engine compressors provide the compression part of the gas turbine engine thermodynamic cycle. There are three basic categories of gas turbine engine compressor: axial compressor, centrifugal compressor and mixed flow compressor. A fourth, unusual, type is the free-piston gas generator, which combines the functions of compressor and combustion chamber in one unit.

== Axial compressor ==
Most high-compression jet engine use axial compressors for their high efficiency. In the axial compressor the air flows parallel to the axis of rotation. Axial compressors are made to be multi-staged. A stage consists of a row of rotating blades called the rotor, which are connected to the central shaft and a row of stationary or fixed blades called stator. In axial flow compressor, the air flows from stage to stage. The role of the rotor blades is to accelerate the incoming air for increasing the kinetic energy of the air. Then the fluid is decelerated across the stators and as a consequence the kinetic energy is converted into the pressure rise by the stators. Through the compressor, the flow area decreases and the blades get smaller and smaller from stage to stage and this compensates for the increase of air pressure and density, creating a constant axial velocity. In axial compressors, there may be up to 20 stages between the air inlet and compressor outlet.

== Centrifugal compressor ==
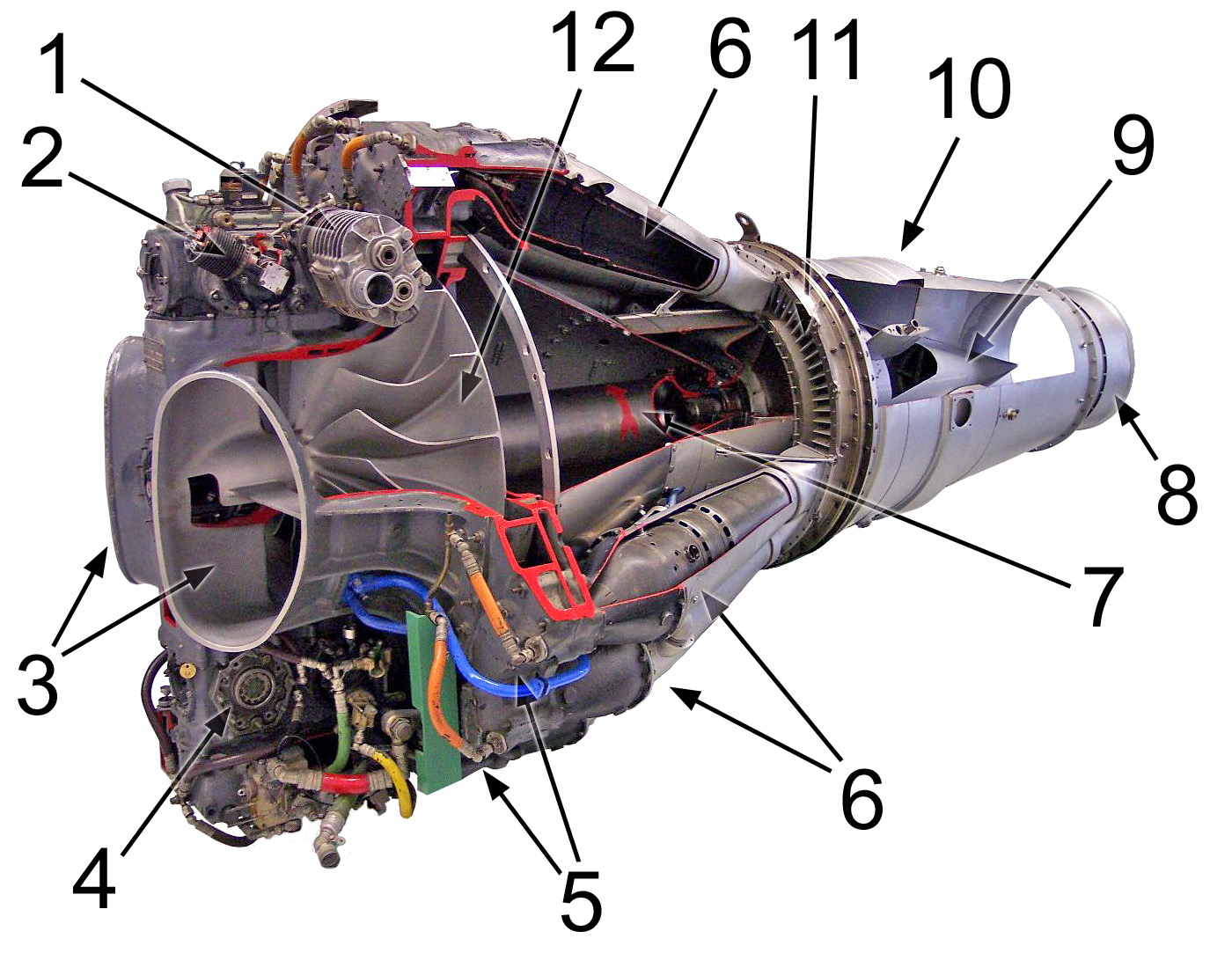
Rolls Royce Goblin II numbered cutaway; the impeller of the centrifugal compressor is number 12

The very first jet engines used centrifugal compressors, and they are still used on small turbojets and turboshaft engines.

The key component that makes a centrifugal compressor is the centrifugal impeller, which contains a rotating set of blades. In a centrifugal compressor, the airflow moves perpendicular to the axis of rotation. When the air passes through the rotating impeller, it experiences a centrifugal force. Air is pushed toward the center, and this radial air movement results in an increase of pressure and the generation of kinetic energy. Then the air passes through another key component of the centrifugal compressor called the diffuser section, which converts the kinetic energy of the air into increased pressure by gradually decreasing air velocity. The diffuser is a fixed or static component that escorts the air flow after leaving the impeller. The impeller and the diffuser contribute about 65% and 35% of the total pressure produced in the centrifugal compressor, respectively.

== Comparison between Axial and Centrifugal Compressor ==
A typical, single-stage, centrifugal compressor can increase the pressure by a factor of 4. A similar single-stage axial compressor can only increase the pressure by a factor of 1.2. Axial compressors retain an advantage over centrifugal compressors, however, because of their ability to have multiple stages. In multi-stage compressors, the pressure is multiplied from row to row, which can increase the pressure by a factor of 40. It is much more difficult to produce an efficient multistage centrifugal compressor because the flow has to be ducted back to the axis at each stage; therefore, most high-compression jet engines incorporate multi-staged axial compressors. If only a moderate amount of compression is required, a centrifugal compressor is much simpler and more efficient to use.

== Mixed-flow compressor ==
In the future, mixed flow compressors may feature at the small end of the market, particularly in turbofans, where the relatively large diameter across the diffuser of a centrifugal compressor is a significant disadvantage.

== Staged compression ==
=== Two-stage ===
At high overall pressure ratios, the compression system is usually split into two units; a low-pressure (LP) compressor mounted on one shaft followed by a high-pressure (HP) compressor mounted on the HP shaft and driven by its own (HP) turbine. On civil turbofans, the first stage of the LP compressor is often a single-stage fan. If the HP compressor pressure ratio exceeds about 4.5:1, then the unit will probably have variable geometry (i.e. variable stators) on the first few stages, to make the surge line on the compressor map more shallow, to accommodate the shallow working line.

=== Three-stage ===
On their large civil turbofans, Rolls-Royce split the compression system into three: a fan, an intermediate-pressure (IP) compressor and an HP compressor, each unit being driven by its own turbine unit. The RB199 military turbofan also has this arrangement.

== Free-piston gas generator ==
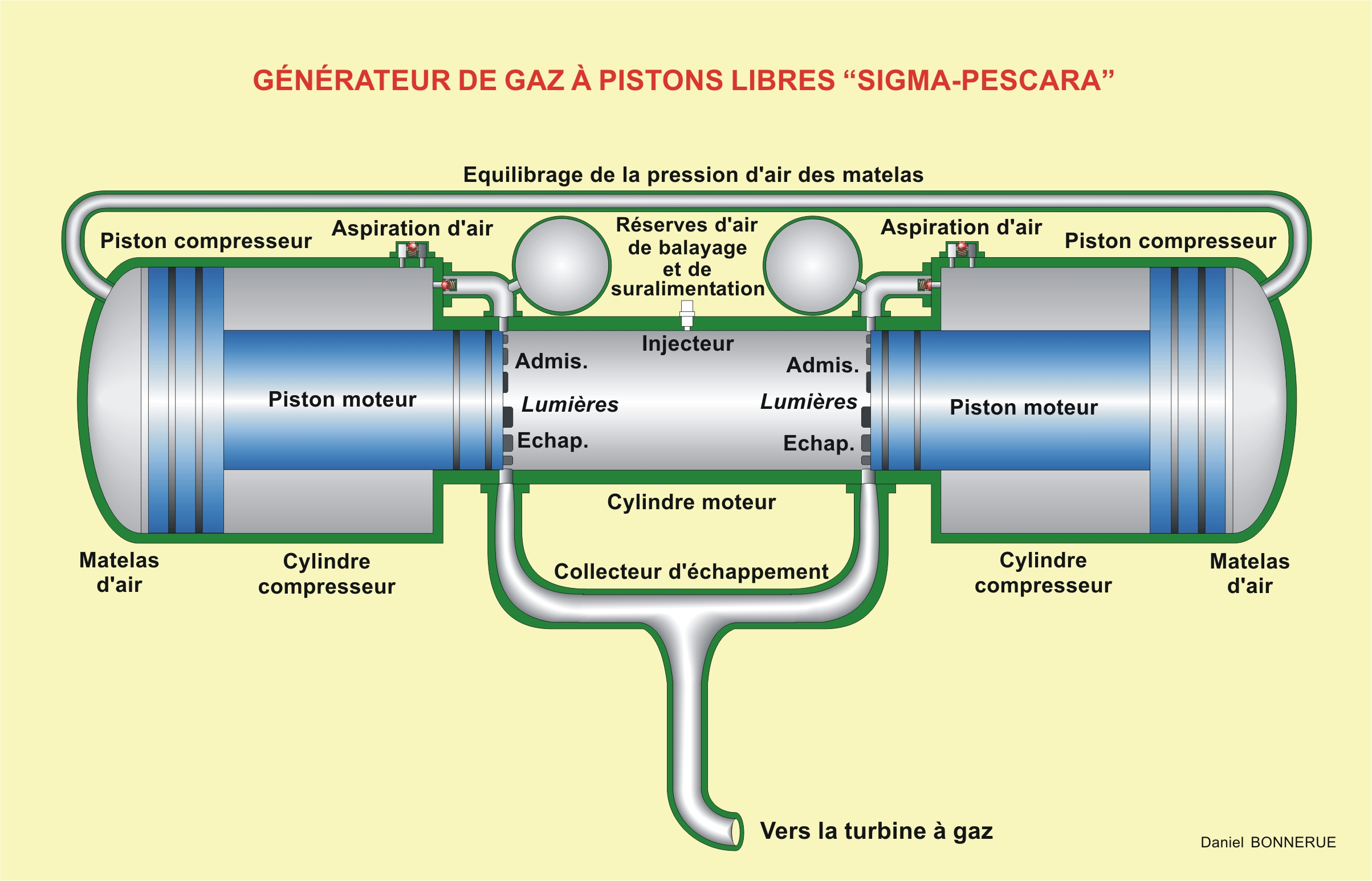
Diagram of free-piston gas generator for gas turbine

A free-piston gas generator is a free-piston engine whose exhaust is used to power a gas turbine. It combines the functions of compressor and combustion chamber in one unit. These machines were quite widely used in the period 1930–1960 but then fell out of favour.

== See also ==
- Index of aviation articles
