= HNA =

HNA may refer to:

== Companies and organizations ==
- HNA Group, a Chinese conglomerate

- Hainan Airlines, a Chinese airline

- Hafslund (company), a Norwegian power company
- Harry N. Abrams, Inc., now Abrams Books, an American publisher
- High North Alliance (Norwegian: Høge Nord Alliansen), an organization of fishing, whaling, and Nordic municipal councils
- Hilti North America, a building support and maintenance company

== Transportation ==
- Hanamaki Airport, serving Iwate Prefecture, Japan (IATA code HNA)
- Hawks Nest Airport, airport near Hawk's Nest Creek, The Bahamas
- Hinton Admiral railway station, in Hampshire, England

== Other ==
- Hereditary neuralgic amyotrophy
- Hexose nucleic acid, synthesized by xenobiology researchers
- Heeresnachrichtenamt, the Austrian Army Intelligence Office
- Heslar Naval Armory, constructed in 1936 in Indianapolis, Indiana
- Hessische/Niedersächsische Allgemeine, a German regional newspaper
- Hina language, a Chadic language spoken in Northern Cameroon
- Holy Names Academy, in Seattle, Washington
- Hoosier Nationals ABA, race that is a part of the American Bicycle Association racing schedule
- Human Neutrophil Antigen
- Wright etch and other etching techniques that use Hydrofluoric, Nitric and Acetic acid (HNA)
