= VPD =

VPD may refer to:

== Science and technology ==
- Vaccine-preventable diseases
- Vapour phase decomposition, a method used in the semiconductor industry
- Vapour-pressure deficit, a measure of the difference between air humidity and saturation

=== Computing ===
- Virtual product development, developing and prototyping products in a completely digital 2D/3D environment
- Vital Product Data, in computer hardware or in AIX Object Data Manager terminology

== Other uses ==
- Vancouver Police Department
- Venezuelan Primera División, top-level association football league in Venezuela
