= IBM RSCT =

IBM Reliable Scalable Cluster Technology (RSCT) is a set of software components that together provide a comprehensive clustering environment for IBM AIX, Linux, Oracle Solaris, and Windows operating systems. RSCT is the infrastructure used by a variety of IBM products to provide clusters with improved system availability, scalability, and ease of use. It follows a list of main RSCT components:

- the Resource Monitoring and Control (RMC) subsystem. This is the scalable, reliable backbone of RSCT. It runs on a single machine or on each node (operating system image) of a cluster and provides a common abstraction for the resources of the individual system or the cluster of nodes. You can use RMC for single system monitoring, or for monitoring nodes in a cluster. In a cluster, however, RMC provides global access to subsystems and resources throughout the cluster, thus providing a single monitoring/management infrastructure for clusters. It is used for HMC DLPAR, sfp, invscout ...
- the RSCT core resource managers. A resource manager is a software layer between a resource (a hardware or software entity that provides services to some other component) and RMC. A resource manager maps programmatic abstractions in RMC into the actual calls and commands of a resource.
- the RSCT cluster security services, which provide the security infrastructure that enables RSCT components to authenticate the identity of other parties.
- the Topology Services subsystem, which, on some cluster configurations, provides node/network failure detection.
- the Group Services subsystem, which, on some cluster configurations, provides cross node/process coordination.

Management Domains and Peer Domains
The set of nodes that is configured for manageability or monitoring is called a management domain of your cluster. The set of nodes that is configured for high availability is called an RSCT peer domain of your cluster.

A peer domain is a set of nodes that have a consistent knowledge of the existence of each other and of the resources shared among them. On each node within the peer domain, RMC depends on a core set of cluster services, which include Topology Services, Group Services and cluster security services.

A management domain is a set of nodes with resources that can be managed and monitored from one of the nodes, which is designated as the management control point (MCP). All other nodes are considered to be managed nodes. Topology Services and Group Services are not used in a management domain.

In order to understand how the various RSCT components are used in a cluster, be aware that nodes of a cluster can be configured for manageability, high availability or both.

== See also ==
- IBM PowerHA (formerly HACMP), IBM clustering software for AIX and Linux
- IBM Cluster System Management (CSM)
