= IBM High Availability Cluster Multiprocessing =

High-availability cluster software

IBM PowerHA SystemMirror
- Developer: IBM
- Stable release: 7.2.7 / December 9, 2022; 3 years ago
- Operating system: AIX
- Type: High-availability cluster
- License: proprietary
- Website: www-03.ibm.com/systems/power/software/availability/aix/

IBM PowerHA SystemMirror (formerly IBM PowerHA and HACMP) is IBM's solution for high-availability clusters on the AIX Unix and Linux for IBM System p platforms and stands for High Availability Cluster Multiprocessing. IBM's HACMP product was first shipped in 1991 and is now in its 20th release - PowerHA SystemMirror for AIX 7.1.

PowerHA can run on up to 32 computers or nodes, each of which is either actively running an application (active) or waiting to take over when another node fails (passive). Data on file systems can be shared between systems in the cluster.

PowerHA relies heavily on IBM's Reliable Scalable Cluster Technology (RSCT). PowerHA is an RSCT aware client. RSCT is distributed with AIX. RSCT includes a daemon called group services that coordinates the response to events of interest to the cluster (for example, an interface or a node fails, or an administrator makes a change to the cluster configuration). Up until PowerHA V6.1, RSCT also monitored cluster nodes, networks and network adapters for failures using the topology services daemon (topsvcs). In the current release (V7.1), RSCT provides coordinate response between nodes, but monitoring and communication are provided by the Cluster Aware AIX (CAA) infrastructure.

The 7.1 release of PowerHA relies heavily on CAA, a clustering infrastructure built into the operating system and exploited by RSCT and PowerHA. CAA provides the monitoring and communication infrastructure for PowerHA and other clustering solutions on AIX, as well as cluster-wide event notification using the Autonomic Health Advisor File System (AHAFS) and cluster-aware AIX commands with clcmd. CAA replaces the function provided by Topology Services (topsvcs) in RSCT in previous releases of PowerHA/HACMP .

== IBM PowerHA SystemMirror Releases ==
- PowerHA SystemMirror 7
  - PowerHA SystemMirror 7.2, released in October 1, 2015; 10 years ago.
    - PowerHA SystemMirror 7.2.1, released in October 11, 2016; 9 years ago.
      - New User Interface.
  - PowerHA SystemMirror 7.1 was released in 2010; 16 years ago, and uses the Cluster Aware AIX (CAA) infrastructure available in AIX V6.1 TL 6 and AIX 7.1
    - PowerHA SystemMirror 7.1.1 February 17, 2012; 14 years ago.
- PowerHA 6
  - PowerHA 6.1, Rebranded again to IBM PowerHA SystemMirror for AIX, GA Oct 27 2009,
    - Now in Standard and Enterprise Editions
    - EMC SRDF support
    - GLVM 2-site Configuration Wizard
    - Improvements to SMIT panels and File Collections
    - IPv6 support
- HACMP 5
  - HACMP 5.5, Rebranded to IBM PowerHA, GA Nov 2008,
    - Asynchronous replication support
    - Updated support for DLPAR/CUOD to include support for IBM POWER5 and POWER6 processors
    - Support for LPAR mobility to relocate critical applications
    - PowerHA/XD PPRC support of Global Mirror when used with SAN Volume Controller
    - Function to allow PowerHA/XD PPRC to support multiple storage subsystems at each site
    - Better integration with the AIX operating system by avoiding modifications to the TCP/IP bringing up process
  - HACMP 5.4.1, Nov 2007, announcement
    - AIX Workload Partitions support (WPAR)
    - New GLVM monitoring
    - NFSv4 support improvements
  - HACMP 5.4, July 2006, announcement
    - Web-based GUI
    - Nondisruptive HACMP cluster startup, upgrades, and maintenance
  - HACMP 5.3, August 2005
  - HACMP 5.2, July 2004
  - HACMP 5.1, July 2003
- HACMP 4
  - HACMP 4.5, July 2002
  - HACMP 4.4, June 2000
  - HACMP 4.3
  - HACMP 4.2
    - Adds Cluster Single Point of Control (CSPOC) feature
    - Dynamic Reconfig

== See also ==
- High-availability cluster
- Live Partition Mobility
