= SMIT =

SMIT may refer to:

== Institutes ==
- IT and Development Centre. Ministry of the Interior, Estonia, agency under the Ministry of the Interior responsible for providing the developing ICT services for Estonia
- Sikkim Manipal Institute of Technology, a co-educational private institute of engineering and management in Majitar, Rangpo, East Sikkim, India

== Other uses ==
- Smit International, a Dutch company operating in the maritime sector
- IBM AIX SMIT, the AIX OS interface
- the Single Market Information Tool, supporting the development of the European single market

== See also ==
- Smit, a surname
