= Homoconjugation =

In chemistry, homoconjugation has two unrelated meanings:

- In acid–base chemistry, homoconjugation is an alternate name for the phenomenon of homoassociation.
- In organic chemistry, homoconjugation is a type of conjugated system where two π-systems are separated by one non-conjugating group. See Conjugated system#Mechanism.
