= LPM =

LPM may refer to:

== Science and technology ==
- Landau–Pomeranchuk–Migdal effect, in particle physics
- Lateral plate mesoderm, found at the periphery of the embryo
- Lipoprotein particle metabolism
- Linear probability model, a regression model used in statistics
- Litre per minute, a volumetric flow rate
- Linear period modulation, a technique for chirp compression
- Luyten Proper-Motion Catalogue
- Line pairs per millimetre, a unit of spatial frequency in image-processing applications

=== Computing ===
- Longest prefix match, a technique used by Internet routers
- Link Power Management, as used by Intel's xHCI USB host-conrollers
- Live Partition Mobility, a technology for moving live virtual machines between IBM POWER servers

== Other uses ==
- Louisville Public Media, a public radio non-profit in Louisville, Kentucky
- Lakhs Per Month, used in India to denote an income of one lakh (100000) Indian Rupees per month
- Malaysia Premier League (Liga Premier Malaysia), a second-tier football league in Malaysia
- Law practice management, the management of a law practice
- Lego Power Miners, a Lego series
- Libertarian Party of Michigan, a political party
- Local People Meter, a Nielsen ratings device
- Landless Peoples Movement, in South Africa
- Log pod Mangartom, a village in Slovenia
