= AIX Toolbox for Linux Applications =

The AIX Toolbox for Linux Applications is a collection of GNU tools for IBM AIX. These tools are available for installation using Red Hat's RPM format.

== Licensing ==
Each of these packages includes its own licensing information and while IBM has made the code available to AIX users, the code is provided as is and has not been thoroughly tested. The Toolbox is meant to provide a core set of some of the most common development tools and libraries along with the more popular GNU packages.
