= System Management Interface Tool =

Management tool for IBM AIX operating system

The System Management Interface Tool (SMIT) is a menu-based management tool for the IBM AIX operating system.

It allows a user to navigate a menu hierarchy of commands, rather than using the command line.

                               System Management

Move cursor to desired item and press Enter.

 █Devices
  System Storage Management (Physical & Logical Storage)
  Security & Users
  Communications Applications and Services
  Print Spooling
  Problem Determination
  Performance & Resource Scheduling
  System Environments
  Processes & Subsystems
  Applications
  Installation Assistant
  Using SMIT (information only)





            
F1=Help             F2=Refresh          F3=Cancel           Esc+8=Image
Esc+9=Shell         Esc+0=Exit          Enter=Do                    

== See also ==
- Object Data Manager
- IBM Web-based System Manager (WSM)
- linuxconf
- Webmin
- YaST
- GAdmintools
