= IBM RT PC =

1986 RISC workstation

IBM RT PC (RISC Technology Personal Computer)

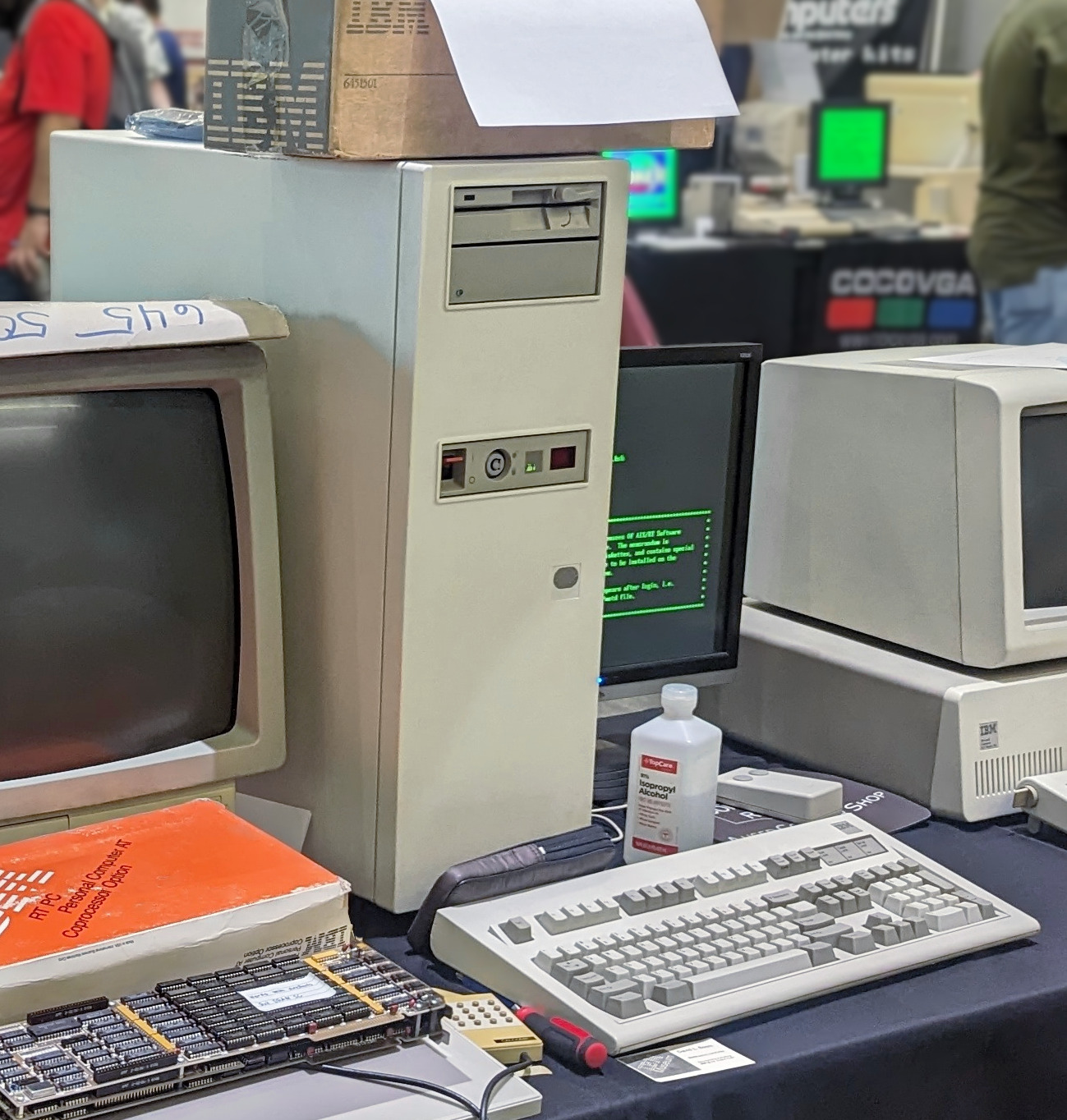
- Developer: IBM / IBM Research
- Manufacturer: IBM
- Type: Workstation computer
- Released: 1986; 40 years ago
- Discontinued: May 1991
- Operating system: AIX; Academic Operating System; Pick
- CPU: IBM ROMP
- Memory: 1 MB RAM, expandable to 16 MB
- Successor: IBM RS/6000
- Related: IBM PC AT

The IBM RT PC (RISC Technology Personal Computer) is a family of workstation computers from IBM introduced in 1986. These were the first commercial computers from IBM that were based on a reduced instruction set computer (RISC) architecture. The RT PC uses IBM's proprietary ROMP microprocessor, which commercialized technologies pioneered by IBM Research's 801 experimental minicomputer (the 801 was the first RISC). The RT PC runs three operating systems: AIX, the Academic Operating System (AOS), and Pick.

The RT PC's specifications were regarded as "less than impressive" compared to contemporary workstations by its competitors in that particular market, although the product was deemed deserving of "a healthy amount of respect", particularly with the prospect of IBM as "a serious competitor" who, despite having a product whose performance was an estimated 18 months behind other vendors, would potentially be able to catch up quickly by applying the company's renowned technological capabilities. Given such performance limitations, the RT PC had little commercial success as a result. IBM responded by introducing the RS/6000 workstations in 1990, which used a new IBM-proprietary RISC processor, the POWER1. All RT PC models were discontinued by May 1991.

== Hardware ==
Two basic types were produced: a floor-standing desk-side tower (IBM 6150), and a desktop (IBM 6151). Both types featured a special board slot for the processor card, as well as machine-specific RAM cards. Each machine had one processor slot, one co-processor slot, and two RAM slots.

There were three versions of the processor card:

- The Standard Processor Card or 032 card had a 5.88 MHz clock rate (170 ns cycle time), 1 MB of standard memory (expandable via 1, 2, or 4 MB memory boards). It could be accompanied by an optional Floating-Point Accelerator (FPA) board, which contained a 10 MHz National Semiconductor NS32081 floating point coprocessor. This processor card was used in the original RT PC models (010, 020, 025, and A25) announced on January 21, 1986.
- The Advanced Processor Card had a 10 MHz clock (100 ns) and either 4 MB memory on the processor card, or external 4 MB ECC memory cards, and featured a built-in 20 MHz Motorola 68881 floating-point processor. The Advanced Processor Card could be accompanied by an optional Advanced Floating-Point Accelerator (AFPA) board, which was based around the Analog Devices ADSP-3220 FP multiplier and ADSP-3221 FP ALU. Models 115, 125, and B25 used these cards. These models were announced on February 17, 1987.
- The Enhanced Advanced Processor Card sported a 12.5 MHz clock (80 ns), 16 MB on-board memory, while an enhanced advanced floating point accelerator was standard. The models 130, 135, and B35 used these cards. They were announced on July 19, 1988.

All RT PCs supported up to 16 MB of memory. Early models were limited to 4 MB of memory because of the capacity of the DRAM ICs used, later models could have up to 16 MB. I/O was provided by eight ISA bus slots. Storage was provided by a 40 or 70 MB hard drive, upgradeable to 300 MB. External SCSI cabinets could be used to provide more storage. Also standard were a mouse and either a 720×512 or 1024×768 pixel-addressable display, and a 4 Mbit/s Token Ring network adapter or 10BASE2 Ethernet adapter.

For running CADAM, a computer-aided design (CAD) program, an IBM 5080 or 5085 graphics processor could be attached. The 5080 and 5085 were contained in a large cabinet that would have been positioned alongside the RT PC. The 5080 was used with a 1,024- by 1,024-pixel IBM 5081 display.

=== 6152 Academic System ===
The 6152 Academic System was a PS/2 Model 60 with a RISC Adapter Card, a Micro Channel board containing a ROMP, its support ICs, and up to 8 MB of memory. It allowed the PS/2 to run ROMP software compiled for the AOS. AOS was downloaded from a RT PC running AOS, via a LAN TCP/IP interface.

== Software ==
One of the novel aspects of the RT design was the use of a microkernel. The keyboard, mouse, display, disk drives and network were all controlled by a microkernel, called Virtual Resource Manager (VRM), which allowed multiple operating systems to be booted and run at the same time. One could "hotkey" from one operating system to the next using the Alt-Tab key combination. Each OS in turn would get possession of the keyboard, mouse and display. Both AIX version 2 and the Pick operating system were ported to this microkernel. Pick was unique in being a unified operating system and database, and ran various accounting applications. It was popular with retail merchants, and accounted for about 4,000 units of sales.

The primary operating system for the RT was AIX version 2. Much of the AIX v2 kernel was written in a variant of the PL/I programming language, which proved troublesome during the migration to AIX v3. AIX v2 included full TCP/IP networking support, as well as SNA, and two networking file systems: NFS, licensed from Sun Microsystems, and IBM Distributed Services (DS). DS had the distinction of being built on top of SNA, and thereby being fully compatible with DS on the IBM midrange AS/400 and mainframe systems. For the graphical user interfaces, AIX v2 came with the X10R3 and later the X10R4 and X11 releases of the X Window System from MIT, together with the Athena widget set. Compilers for C and Fortran programming languages were available.

Some RT PCs were also shipped with the Academic Operating System (AOS), an IBM port of 4.3BSD Unix to the RT PC. It was offered as an alternative to AIX to US universities eligible for an IBM educational discount. AOS added a few extra features to 4.3BSD, notably NFS, and an almost ANSI C-compliant C compiler. A later version of AOS existed that was derived from 4.3BSD-Reno, but it was not widely distributed.

The RT forced an important stepping-stone in the development of the X Window System, when a group at Brown University ported X version 9 to the system. Problems with reading unaligned data on the RT forced an incompatible protocol change, leading to version 10 in late 1985.

== Sales and market reception ==
When the RT PC was introduced in January 1986, it competed with several workstations from established providers: the Apollo Computer Domain Series 3000, the DEC MicroVAX II, and Sun Microsystems Sun-3. Rivals, Computerworld said, "breath[ed] a sigh of relief" that IBM's product was neither cheaper nor faster than theirs. Analysts said that RT PC was too expensive (almost $40,000 for a CAD/CAM system) and imitative of rivals' products, with unimpressive graphics and networking capabilities, but expected that IBM would continue to compete for the workstation market.

The performance of the RT, in comparison with other contemporaneous Unix workstations, was not outstanding. In particular, the floating point performance was poor, and was scandalized mid-life with the discovery of a bug in the floating point square root routine. Personal Computer World said "it's hard to see what you get with the 6150 that you can't get by combining any other Unix box to run multi-user applications, with a cheap AT clone to run single-user PC applications". Both MIT's Project Athena and Brown University's Institute for Research in Information and Scholarship found the RT inferior to other computers.

Many thought that the RT was part of IBM's Personal Computer line of computers. This confusion started with its initial name, "IBM RT PC". Initially, it seemed that even IBM thought that it was a high-end Personal Computer given the initially stunning lack of support that it received from IBM. This could be explained by the sales commission structure the IBM gave the system: salesmen received commissions similar to those for the sale of a PC. With typically configured models priced at $20,000, it was a hard sell, and the lack of any reasonable commission lost the interest of IBM's sales force.

With the RT system's modest processing power (when first announced), and with announcements later that year by some other workstation vendors, industry analysts questioned IBM's directions. AIX for the RT was another IBM attempt to sell Unix, after PC/IX for the IBM PC in September 1984. The lack of software packages and IBM's sometimes lackluster support of AIX, in addition to sometimes unusual changes from traditional, de facto UNIX operating system standards, caused most software suppliers to be slow in embracing the RT and AIX. The RT found its home mostly in the CAD/CAM and CATIA markets, with some inroads into the scientific and educational areas, especially after the announcement of AOS and substantial discounts for the educational community. The RT running the Pick OS also found use as shopping store control systems, given the strong database, accounting system and general business support in the Pick OS. The RT also did well as an interface system between IBM's larger mainframes, due to its SNA and DS support, and some of its point-of-sale terminals, store control systems, and machine shop control systems.

Approximately 23,000 RTs were sold over its lifetime, with some 4,000 going into IBM's development and sales organizations. Pick OS sales accounted for about 4,000 units.

By 1990 IBM only had 1.8% of the workstation market. The company in February 1990 announced the much better-received RS/6000. InfoWorld said its success for the company was important after the "disastrous" RT PC, which "caused only laughter among competitors".

== As part of the NSFNET backbone ==
In 1987, "The NSF starts to implement its T1 backbone between the supercomputing centers with 24 RT-PCs in parallel implemented by IBM as ‘parallel routers’. The T1 idea is so successful that proposals for T3 speeds in the backbone begin. Internet History of 1980s

The National Science Foundation Network (NSFNET) was the forerunner of the Internet. From July 1988 to November 1992, the NSFNET's T1 backbone network used routers built from multiple RT PCs (typically nine) interconnected by a Token Ring LAN.
