= Sodium diacetate =

Acidic food flavoring

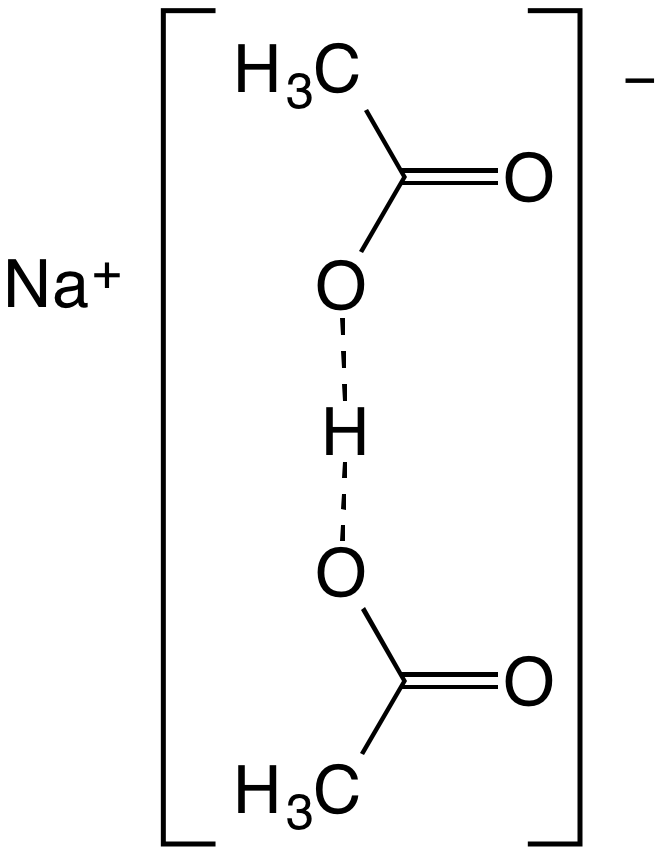
- Sodium diacetate

Names
- IUPAC name Sodium diacetate
- Other names Sodium diacetate (anhydrous); Sodium hydrogen acetate; Sodium acid acetate

Identifiers
CAS Number	126-96-5
3D model (JSmol)	Interactive image
ChemSpider	29100
ECHA InfoCard	100.004.378
MeSH	diacetate sodium diacetate
PubChem CID	22646212
UNII	26WJH3CS0B
CompTox Dashboard (EPA)	DTXSID3034909
- InChI: InChI=1S/2C2H4O2.2Na/c2*1-2(3)4;;/h2*1H3,(H,3,4);;/q;;2*+1/p-2 Key: OPGYRRGJRBEUFK-UHFFFAOYSA-L
- SMILES: O=C(C)O[H-]OC(C)=O.[Na+]

Properties
Chemical formula	C_{4}H_{7}NaO_{4}
Molar mass	142.086 g·mol^{−1}
Appearance	White powder
Odor	Acetic acid (vinegar) odor
Solubility in water	1 g/mL
Solubility in alcohol	Slightly
Solubility in ether	Insoluble

Hazards
- Occupational safety and health (OHS/OSH)
Inhalation hazards	Irritant
Eye hazards	Irritant
- GHS labelling
Pictograms	(GHS05: Corrosive) (GHS07: Exclamation mark)
Signal word	Danger
Hazard statements	H318, H319
Precautionary statements	P264, P280, P305+P351+P338, P310, P337+P313
Flash point	>150 °C (302 °F)
- Lethal dose or concentration (LD, LC)
LD_{50} (median dose)	>2,000 mg/kg (rat, dermal), 5,600 mg/kg (rat, oral)
Safety data sheet (SDS)	PubChem sodium diacetate LCSS
- Except where otherwise noted, data are given for materials in their standard state (at 25 °C [77 °F], 100 kPa). Infobox references

Sodium diacetate is a compound with formula NaH(C_{2}H_{3}O_{2})_{2}. It is a salt of acetic acid. It is a colorless solid that is used in seasonings and as an antimicrobial agent.

== Preparation and structure ==
The salt forms upon half-neutralization of acetic acid followed by evaporation of the solution. It can be viewed as the result of homoassociation, an effect that enhances the acidity of acetic acid in concentrated solution:

2 CH_{3}CO_{2}H + NaOH → Na^{+}[(CH_{3}CO_{2})_{2}H]^{−} + H_{2}O

Also described as the sodium acid salt of acetic acid, it is best described as the sodium salt of the hydrogen-bonded anion (CH_{3}CO_{2})_{2}H^{−}. The O···O distance is about 2.47 angstrom. The species has no significant existence in solution but forms stable crystals.

== Applications ==
As a food additive, it has E number E262. It is used both as a preservative and to impart a salt and vinegar flavor, for example in salt and vinegar chips.

== See also ==
- Sodium acetate
