= Linuxconf =

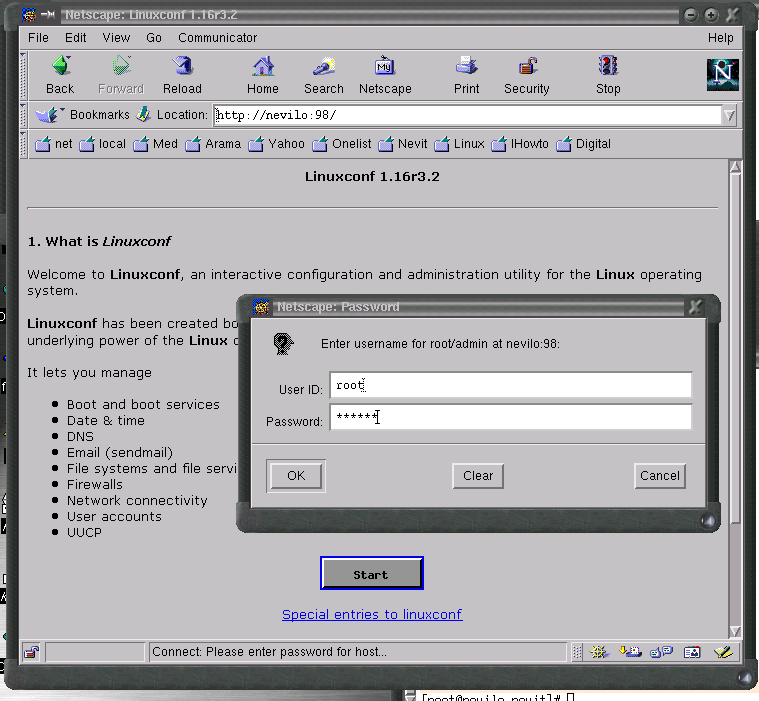
- Linuxconf 1.16r3.2
- Website: www.solucorp.qc.ca/linuxconf/

Linuxconf was a system configuration tool for the Linux operating system. It features different user interfaces: a text interface or a graphical user interface in the form of a Web page or native application. Most Linux distributions consider it deprecated compared to other tools such as Webmin, the system-config-* tools on Red Hat Enterprise Linux/Fedora, drakconf on Mandriva, YaST on openSUSE and so on. Linuxconf was deprecated from Red Hat Linux in version 7.1 in April 2001.

It was created by Jacques Gélinas of Solucorp, a company based in Québec.
