= Vapour phase decomposition =

Vapour phase decomposition (VPD) is a method used in the semiconductor industry to improve the sensitivity of total-reflection x-ray fluorescence spectroscopy by changing the contaminant from a thin layer (which has an angle-dependent fluorescence intensity in the TXRF-domain) to a granular residue. When using granular residue the limits of detection are improved because of a more intense fluorescence signal in angles smaller than the isokinetic angle.

== Method ==
When using granular residue the limits of detection are improved because of a more intense fluorescence signal in angles smaller than the isokinetic angle. This can be achieved by enhancing the impurity concentration in the solution to be analyzed. In standard atomic absorption spectroscopy (AAS), the impurity is dissolved together with the matrix element. In VPD, the surface of the wafer is exposed to hydrofluoric acid vapour, which causes the surface oxide to dissolve together with the impurity metals. The acid droplets, condensed on the surface, are then analyzed using AAS.

== Advantages ==
The method has yielded good results for the detection and measurement of nickel and iron. To improve the range of elemental impurities and lower detection limits, the acid droplets obtained from the silicon wafers are analyzed by ICP-MS (Inductively coupled plasma mass spectrometry). This technique, VPD ICP-MS provides accurate measurement of up to 60 elements and detection limits of in the range of 1E6-E10 atoms/sq.cm on the silicon wafer.

== Related techniques ==
One related technique is VPD-DC (vapour phase decomposition-droplet collection), where the wafer is scanned with a droplet that collects the metal ions that were dissolved in the decomposition step. This procedure affords better limits of detection when applying AAS in order to detect metal impurities of very small concentrations on wafer surfaces.
