= Vital Product Data =

Vital Product Data (VPD) is a collection of configuration and informational data associated with a particular set of hardware or software. VPD stores information such as part numbers, serial numbers, and engineering change levels. Not all devices attached to a system will provide VPD, but it is often available from PCI and SCSI devices. Parallel ATA and USB devices also provide similar data, but do not refer to it as VPD.

VPD data is typically burned onto EEPROMs associated with various hardware components, or can be queried through attached I2C buses. It is used by firmware (for example, OpenFirmware) to determine the nature of the system hardware, and to shield the operation of the firmware from minor changes and variations of hardware implementations within a given machine model number.

== AIX ==
In IBM's AIX operating system, VPD also refers to a subset of database tables in the Object Data Manager (ODM) obtained from either the Customized VPD object class or platform specific areas, therefore the VPD and ODM terms are sometimes referred to interchangeably. lscfg command can be used in AIX to get the VPD.

lscfg [-v] [-p] [-s] [-l Name]

== Other Unix-like systems ==
Package dmidecode provides commands vpddecode, biosdecode, and dmidecode, which can display hardware Vital Product Data. This package is available for many Unix-like operating systems.

== See also ==
- Organizationally unique identifier
- World Wide Name
