= Hydrofluoric acid =

Solution of hydrogen fluoride in water

Hydrofluoric acid (HF + H_{2}O ⇌ F^{−} + H_{3}O^{+})

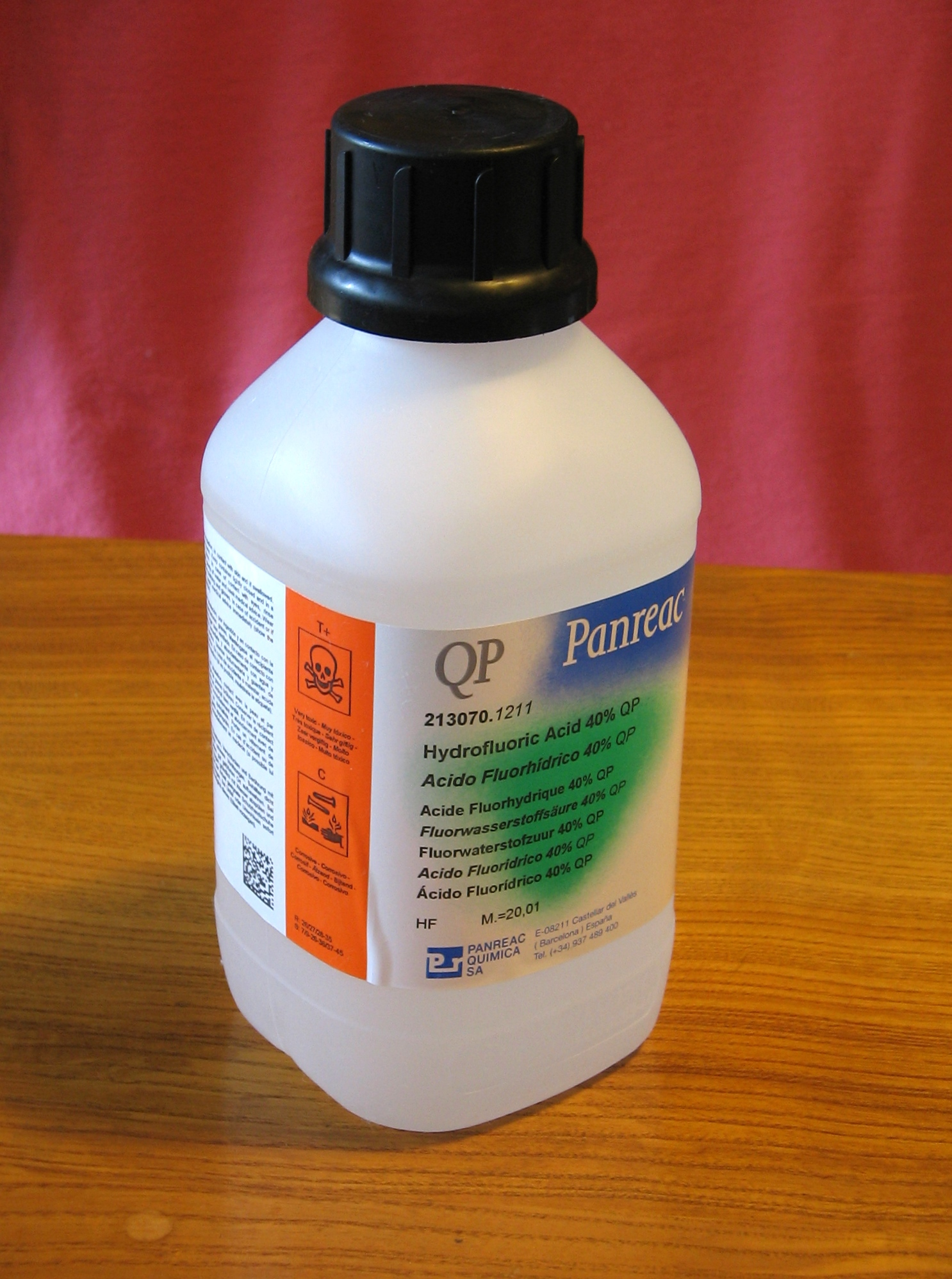

Names
- IUPAC name Fluorane
- Other names Fluorhydric acid Hydronium fluoride

Identifiers
CAS Number	7664-39-3
3D model (JSmol)	Interactive image; Interactive image
ChEBI	CHEBI:29228
ChemSpider	14214
EC Number	231-634-8
PubChem CID	14917
RTECS number	MW7875000
UNII	RGL5YE86CZ
CompTox Dashboard (EPA)	DTXSID1049641
- InChI: InChI=1S/FH/h1H Key: KRHYYFGTRYWZRS-UHFFFAOYSA-N; InChI=1/FH/h1H Key: KRHYYFGTRYWZRS-UHFFFAOYAC
- SMILES: F.O; [F-].[OH3+]

Properties
Chemical formula	HF (aq)
Appearance	Colorless liquid
Density	1.15 g/mL (for 48% solution)
Acidity (pK_{a})	3.17

Hazards
- GHS labelling
Pictograms	
Signal word	Danger
Hazard statements	H280, H300+H310+H330, H314
Precautionary statements	P260, P262, P264, P270, P271, P280, P284, P301+P310, P301+P330+P331, P302+P350, P303+P361+P353, P304+P340, P305+P351+P338, P310, P320, P321, P330, P361, P363, P403+P233, P405, P410+P403, P501
NFPA 704 (fire diamond)	4 0 0 ACID
- Except where otherwise noted, data are given for materials in their standard state (at 25 °C [77 °F], 100 kPa). verify (what is ?) Infobox references

Hydrofluoric acid is formed when dissolving hydrogen fluoride (HF) in water. They are clear, acidic and very corrosive solutions. It is typically available at a 49% (48-52%) solution but they can be purchased in higher concentrations. While not as commonly used in its anhydrous form hydrogen fluoride, it is more often used in lab settings to produce Organofluorine Compounds and other fluoride compounds. Scheele was able to create this solution in 1771. Industrially it is made by mixing the mineral fluorite (CaF_{2}) with sulfuric acid. Many inorganic fluorides are created using hydrofluoric acid. This includes cryolite and aluminium trifluoride which are used in aluminium smelting. Since it can break down silica and most metal oxides. It is commonly used in glass etching, etching of silicon wafers for the semiconductor industry, and to clean industrial boilers. In smaller quantities it can be found in some rust removers and wheel cleaners. Hydrofluoric acid is considered a weak acid when in a dilute solution. (pK_{a} ≈ 3.2) Like other hydrohalic acids. It may be deadly if ingested, inhaled, or if it comes into contact with skin. The burns it causes can be painless at first but still need immediate attention.

== Uses ==
=== Production of inorganic fluorides ===
Most high-volume inorganic fluoride compounds are prepared from hydrofluoric acid. Foremost are Na_{3}AlF_{6}, cryolite, and AlF_{3}, aluminium trifluoride. A molten mixture of these solids serves as a high-temperature solvent for the production of metallic aluminium. Other inorganic fluorides prepared from hydrofluoric acid include sodium fluoride and uranium hexafluoride.

=== Etchant, cleaner ===
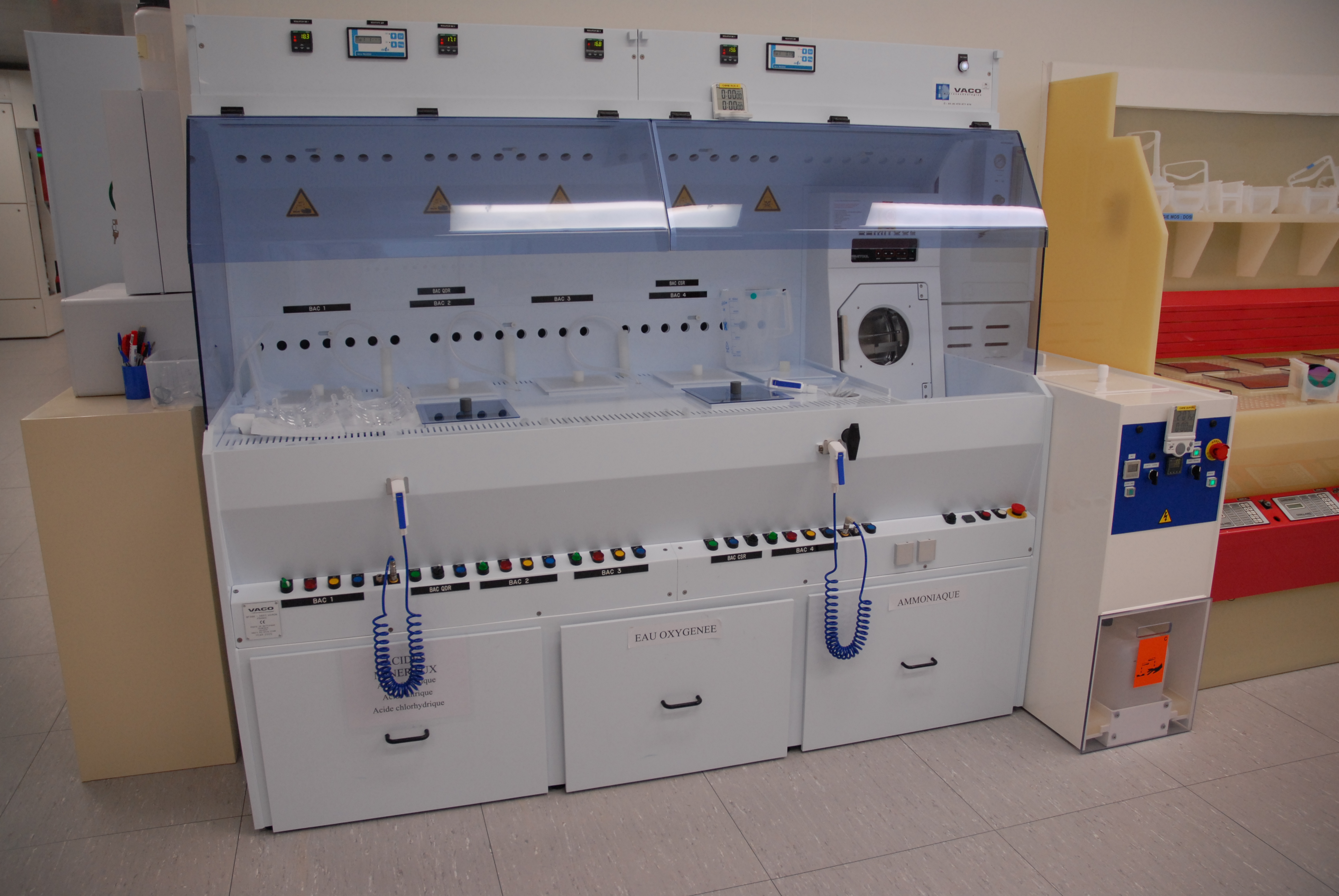
Wet etching tanks

It is used in the semiconductor industry as a major component of Wright etch and buffered oxide etch, which are used to clean silicon wafers. In a similar manner it is used to etch glass by treatment with silicon dioxide to form gaseous or water-soluble silicon fluorides. It can be used to polish and frost glass.

SiO_{2} + 4 HF → SiF_{4}(g) + 2 H_{2}O
SiO_{2} + 6 HF → H_{2}SiF_{6} + 2 H_{2}O

A 5% to 9% hydrofluoric acid gel is commonly used to etch all ceramic dental restorations to improve bonding. For similar reasons, dilute hydrofluoric acid is a component of household rust stain remover, in car washes in "wheel cleaner" compounds, in ceramic and fabric rust inhibitors, and in water spot removers. Because of its ability to dissolve iron oxides as well as silica-based contaminants, hydrofluoric acid is used in pre-commissioning boilers that produce high-pressure steam. Hydrofluoric acid is useful for dissolving rock samples (usually powdered) prior to analysis. In similar manner, this acid is used in acid macerations to extract organic fossils from silicate rocks. Fossiliferous rock may be immersed directly into the acid, or a cellulose nitrate film may be applied (dissolved in amyl acetate), which adheres to the organic component and allows the rock to be dissolved around it.

== Production ==
Hydrofluoric acid was first prepared in 1771, by Carl Wilhelm Scheele. It is now mainly produced by treatment of the mineral fluorite, CaF_{2}, with concentrated sulfuric acid at approximately 265 °C.

CaF_{2} + H_{2}SO_{4} → 2 HF + CaSO_{4}

The acid is also a by-product of the production of phosphoric acid from apatite and fluoroapatite. Digestion of the mineral with sulfuric acid at elevated temperatures releases a mixture of gases, including hydrogen fluoride, which may be recovered.

Because of its high reactivity toward glass, hydrofluoric acid is stored in fluorinated plastic (often PTFE) containers.

== Properties ==
In dilute aqueous solution, hydrogen fluoride behaves as a weak acid. Infrared spectroscopy has been used to show that, in solution, dissociation is accompanied by formation of the ion pair H_{3}O^{+}·F^{−}.

H_{2}O + HF ⇌ H_{3}O^{+}⋅F^{−} pK_{a} = 3.17

This ion pair has been characterized in the crystalline state at very low temperature. Further association has been characterized both in solution and in the solid state.

HF + F^{−} ⇌ HF^{−}_{2} log K = 0.6

It is assumed that polymerization occurs as the concentration increases. This assumption is supported by the isolation of a salt of a tetrameric anion H_{3}F^{−}_{4} and by low-temperature X-ray crystallography. The species that are present in concentrated aqueous solutions of hydrogen fluoride have not all been characterized; in addition to HF^{−}_{2} which is known the formation of other polymeric species, H_{n−1}F^{−}_{n}, is highly likely.

The Hammett acidity function, H_{0}, for 100% HF was first reported as −10.2, while later compilations show −11, comparable to values near −12 for pure sulfuric acid.

== Acidity ==
Unlike other hydrohalic acids, such as hydrochloric acid, hydrogen fluoride is only a weak acid in dilute aqueous solution. This is in part a result of the strength of the hydrogen–fluorine bond, but also of other factors such as the tendency of HF, H_{2}O, and F^{−} anions to form clusters. At high concentrations, HF molecules undergo homoassociation to form polyatomic ions (such as bifluoride, HF^{−}_{2}) and protons, thus greatly increasing the acidity. This leads to protonation of very strong acids like hydrochloric, sulfuric, or nitric acids when using concentrated hydrofluoric acid solutions. Although hydrofluoric acid is regarded as a weak acid, it is very corrosive, even attacking glass when hydrated.

Dilute solutions are weakly acidic with an acid ionization constant K_{a} = 6.6×10^{−4} (or pK_{a} = 3.18), in contrast to corresponding solutions of the other hydrogen halides, which are strong acids (pK_{a} < 0). However, concentrated solutions of hydrogen fluoride are much more strongly acidic than implied by this value, as shown by measurements of the Hammett acidity function H_{0}(or "effective pH"). During self ionization of 100% liquid HF the H_{0} was first measured as −10.2 and later compiled as −11, comparable to values near −12 for sulfuric acid.

In thermodynamic terms, HF solutions are highly non-ideal, with the activity of HF increasing much more rapidly than its concentration. The weak acidity in dilute solution is sometimes attributed to the high H—F bond strength, which combines with the high dissolution enthalpy of HF to outweigh the more negative enthalpy of hydration of the fluoride ion. Paul Giguère and Sylvia Turrell have shown by infrared spectroscopy that the predominant solute species in dilute solution is the hydrogen-bonded ion pair H_{3}O^{+}·F^{−}.

H_{2}O + HF ⇌ H_{3}O^{+}·F^{−}

With increasing concentration of HF the concentration of the hydrogen difluoride ion also increases. The reaction

3 HF ⇌ HF^{−}_{2} + H_{2}F^{+}

is an example of homoconjugation.

== Health and safety ==
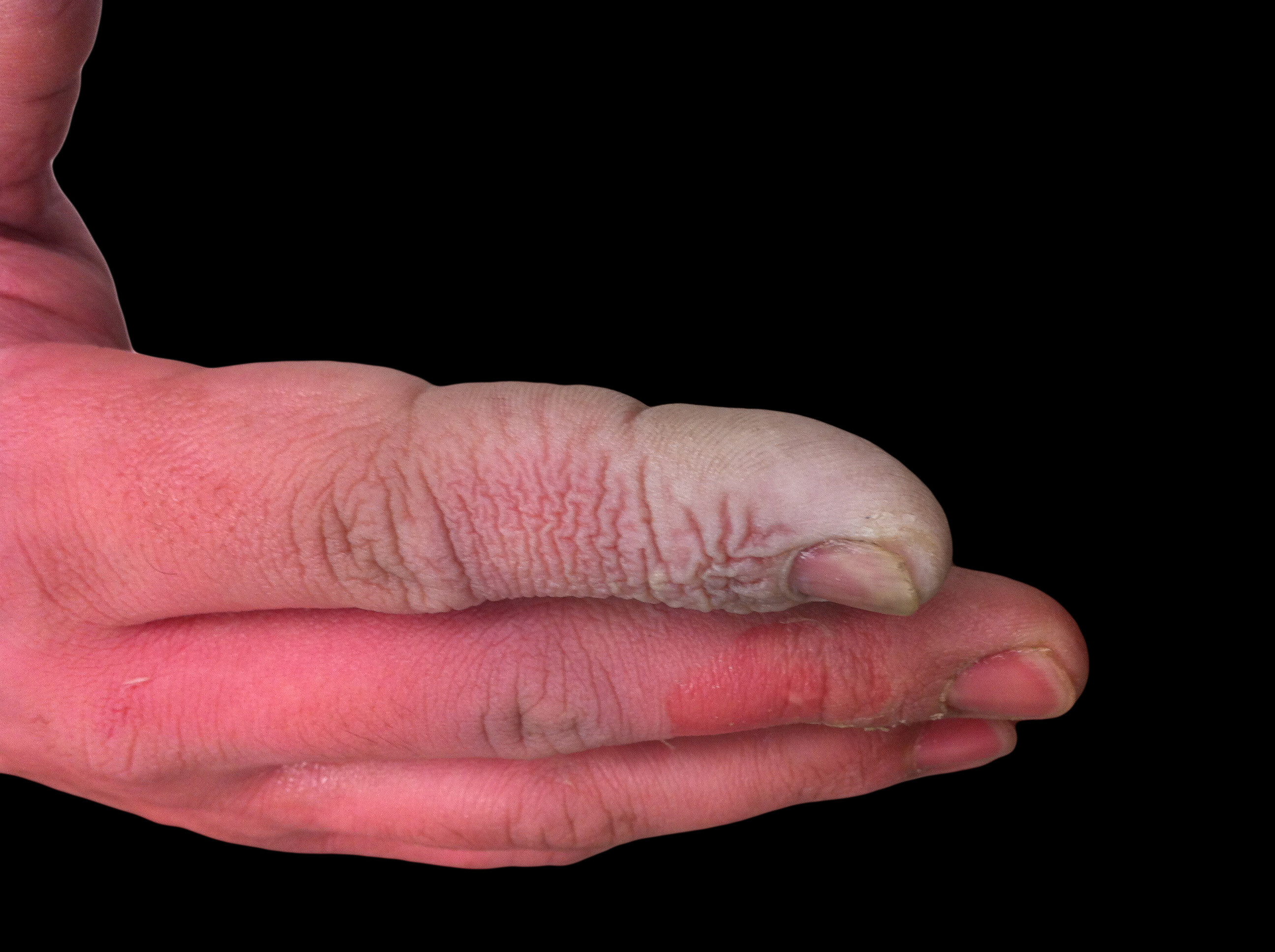
A hydrofluoric acid burn of the hand

Since it can penetrate tissue, poisoning can occur readily through exposure of skin or eyes, inhalation, or ingestion. Symptoms of exposure to hydrofluoric acid may not be immediately evident, and this can provide false reassurance to victims, causing them to delay medical treatment. Despite its irritating vapor, HF may reach dangerous levels without an obvious odor. It interferes with nerve function, meaning that burns may not initially be painful. Accidental exposures can go unnoticed, delaying treatment and increasing the extent and seriousness of the injury. Symptoms of HF exposure include irritation of the eyes, skin, nose, and throat, eye and skin burns, rhinitis, bronchitis, pulmonary edema (fluid buildup in the lungs), and bone damage due to HF strongly interacting with calcium in bones. In a concentrated form, HF can cause severe tissue destruction through lesions and mucous membrane damage, but dilute HF is still dangerous because of its high lipid affinity, leading to cellular death of nerves, blood vessels, tendons, bones, and other tissues. Cases of intestinal damage from contact with hydrofluoric acid requiring surgical intervention are rare but known in medical literature.

Hydrofluoric acid burns can be treated with calcium gluconate gel. Hexafluorine solution has been claimed to mitigate the adverse effects of burns. However, further studies have found the efficacy of the solution in reducing the longer term effects of electrolyte imbalance is almost identical to that of water rinsing.

== See also ==
- 2019 Philadelphia refinery explosion
- Vapour phase decomposition
