= Homoassociation =

In acid–base chemistry, homoassociation (an IUPAC term) is an association between a base and its conjugate acid through a hydrogen bond.

Most commonly, homoassociation leads to the enhancement of the acidity of an acid by itself. The effect is accentuated at high concentrations, i.e. the ionization of an acid varies nonlinearly with concentration. This effect arises from the stabilization of the conjugate base by its formation of a hydrogen bond to the parent acid. A well known case is hydrofluoric acid, which is a significantly stronger acid when concentrated than when dilute due to the following equilibria:

2 HF $\rightleftharpoons$ H_{2}F^{+} + F^{−} (autoionization of HF)
HF + F^{−} $\rightleftharpoons$ HF_{2}^{−} (homoassociation)

Overall:

3 HF $\rightleftharpoons$ HF_{2}^{−} + H_{2}F^{+}

The bifluoride anion (HF_{2}^{−}) encourages the ionization of HF by stabilizing the F^{−}. Thus, the usual ionization constant for hydrofluoric acid (10^{−3.15}) understates the acidity of concentrated solutions of HF.

The effect of homoassociation is often high in solvents other than water (non-aqueous solutions), wherein dissociation is often low. Carboxylic acids and phenols exhibit this effect, for example in sodium diacetate.
