= Live Partition Mobility =

Live Partition Mobility is a chargeable Live migration feature of IBM POWER6, POWER7, POWER8 and POWER9 servers, available since 2007, that allows a running LPAR to be relocated from one system to another. In concept, it is similar to VMware VMotion.

Live Partition Mobility, a component of the PowerVM Enterprise Edition hardware feature, provides the ability to move AIX, IBM i, and Linux logical partitions from one system to another. The mobility process transfers the system environment that includes the processor state, memory, attached virtual devices, and connected users.

The source and target systems must have access to the same network and SANs but need not be of the same type, the only requirement is they use POWER6, POWER7, or POWER8 processors. Partitions that are to be relocated must be fully virtualized (i.e. have no dedicated I/O adapters) although it is possible to use multi-pathing software to fail over to virtual adapters for the duration of the move.

Any sized partition can be moved; essentially, memory is copied asynchronously from one system to another to create a clone of a running partition, with "dirty" pages being re-copied as necessary. When a threshold is reached (i.e. when a high percentage of the pages have been successfully copied across), the partition is transitioned to the target machine and any remaining pages are copied across synchronously. The agents which carry out the memory copying are nominated Virtual I/O Servers on each machine; a standard Ethernet network is used for data transmission.

Live Partition Mobility is used to avoid outages for planned server maintenance, for load balancing across multiple servers and for energy conservation.

== Recommended reading ==
- IBM POWER6 partition mobility: Moving virtual servers seamlessly between physical systems, IBM, Nov 2007
- PowerVM Live Partition Mobility on IBM System p, IBM, Nov 2007 (IBM link is dead. Article tagged as obsolete)
- IBM Live Partition Mobility
