= Tourism in Germany =

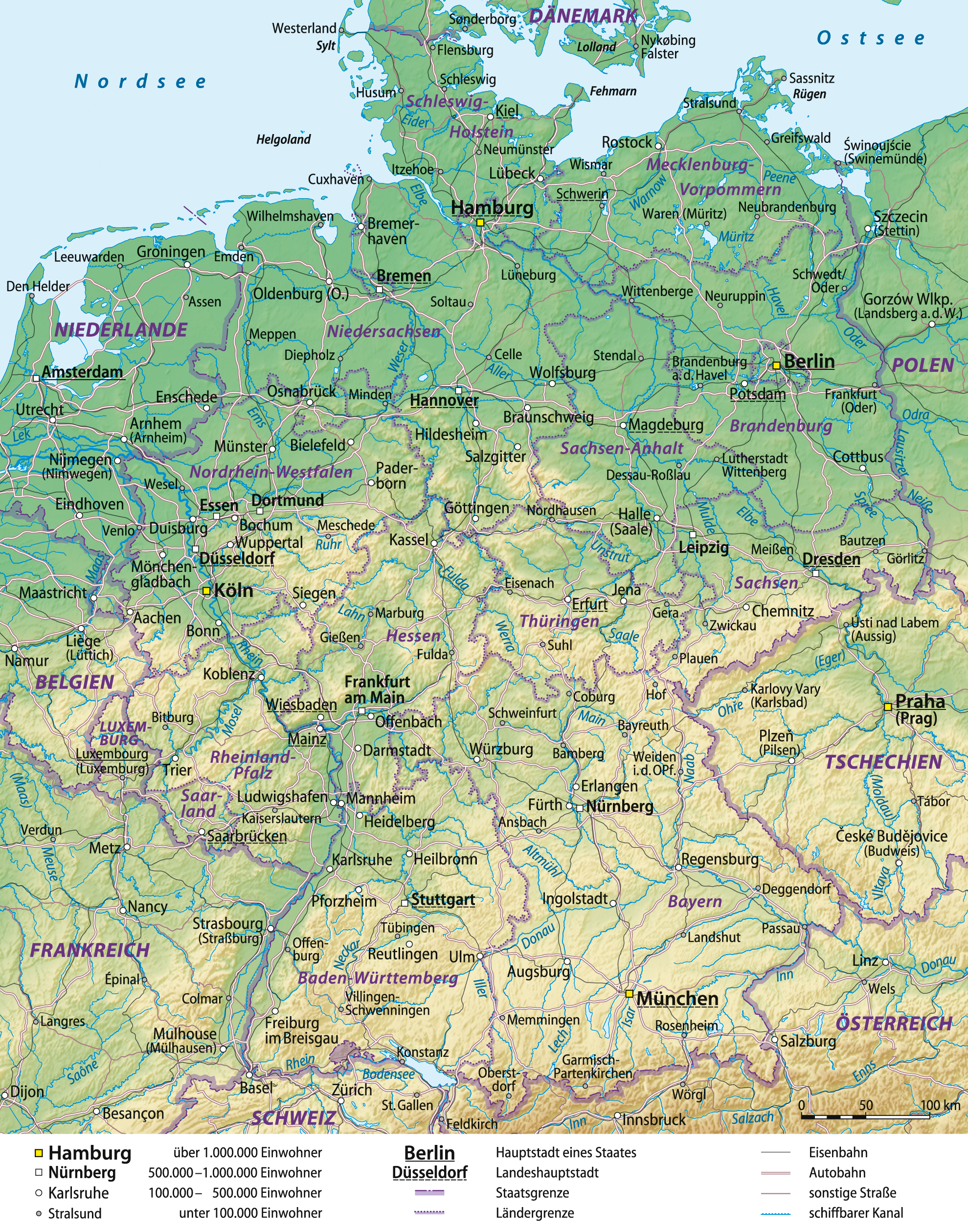
Physical map of Germany

Tourism in Germany is a significant sector of the national economy. As of 2023, Germany is the world's third-largest travel and tourism market, with the sector contributing approximately $487.6 billion to the country's GDP. It is the eight-most-visited country in the world, with a total of 407.26 million overnight stays in 2012. This number includes 68.83 million nights by foreign visitors. In 2012, over 30.4 million international tourists arrived in Germany, bringing over US$38 billion in international tourism receipts to the country.

Germany’s main tourist destinations include its major cities as well as rural and scenic areas such as the Bavarian Alps, the Black Forest, the Rhine Valley, and the Baltic and North Sea coastlines. The country contains numerous UNESCO World Heritage Sites and national parks as well as a large number of museums, historic monuments, castles, and churches that draw culturally motivated visitors.

Germany is also known internationally for several recurring events and traditions that attract tourists, including the Munich Oktoberfest and the Christmas markets held in many towns and cities during the Advent season. Business and conference tourism is an additional component of the sector, with Germany hosting a number of major international trade fairs throughout the year.

Tourism infrastructure in Germany includes an extensive rail network, motorway system, and several major international airports. The sector is supported at the national level by the German National Tourist Board, which promotes Germany as a travel destination in international markets. The ITB Berlin is the world's leading tourism trade fair.

According to Travel and Tourism Competitiveness Reports, Germany is ranked 3 out of 136 countries in the 2017 report, and is rated as one of the safest travel destinations worldwide. According to surveys, the top three reasons for tourists to come to Germany are the German culture, outdoor activities, German holidays and festivities, the countryside and rural areas, and the German cities.

== History ==
The history of tourism in Germany goes back to cities and landscapes being visited for education and recreation. From the late 18th century onwards, cities like Dresden, Munich, Weimar and Berlin were major stops on a European Grand Tour.

Spas and Seaside resorts on the North and Baltic Sea (e.g. Rugia and Usedom islands, Heiligendamm, the islands Norderney and Sylt) particularly developed during the 19th and early 20th century, when major train routes were built to connect the seaside spas to urban centers. An extensive bathing and recreation industry materialized in Germany around 1900. At rivers and close to natural landscapes (along the Middle Rhine valley and in Saxon Switzerland for example) many health spas, hotels and recreational facilities were established since the 19th century.

Since the end of World War II tourism has expanded greatly, as many tourists visit Germany to experience a sense of European history and the diverse German landscape. The country features 14 national parks, including the Jasmund National Park, the Vorpommern Lagoon Area National Park, the Müritz National Park, the Wadden Sea National Parks, the Harz National Park, the Hainich National Park, the Saxon Switzerland National Park, the Bavarian Forest National Park and the Berchtesgaden National Park. In addition, there are 14 Biosphere Reserves, as well as 98 nature parks.

The countryside has a pastoral aura, while the bigger cities exhibit both a modern and classical feel. Small and medium-sized cities often preserved their historical appearance and have old towns with remarkable architectural heritage – these are called Altstadt in German.

== Statistics ==
Yearly tourist arrivals in millions

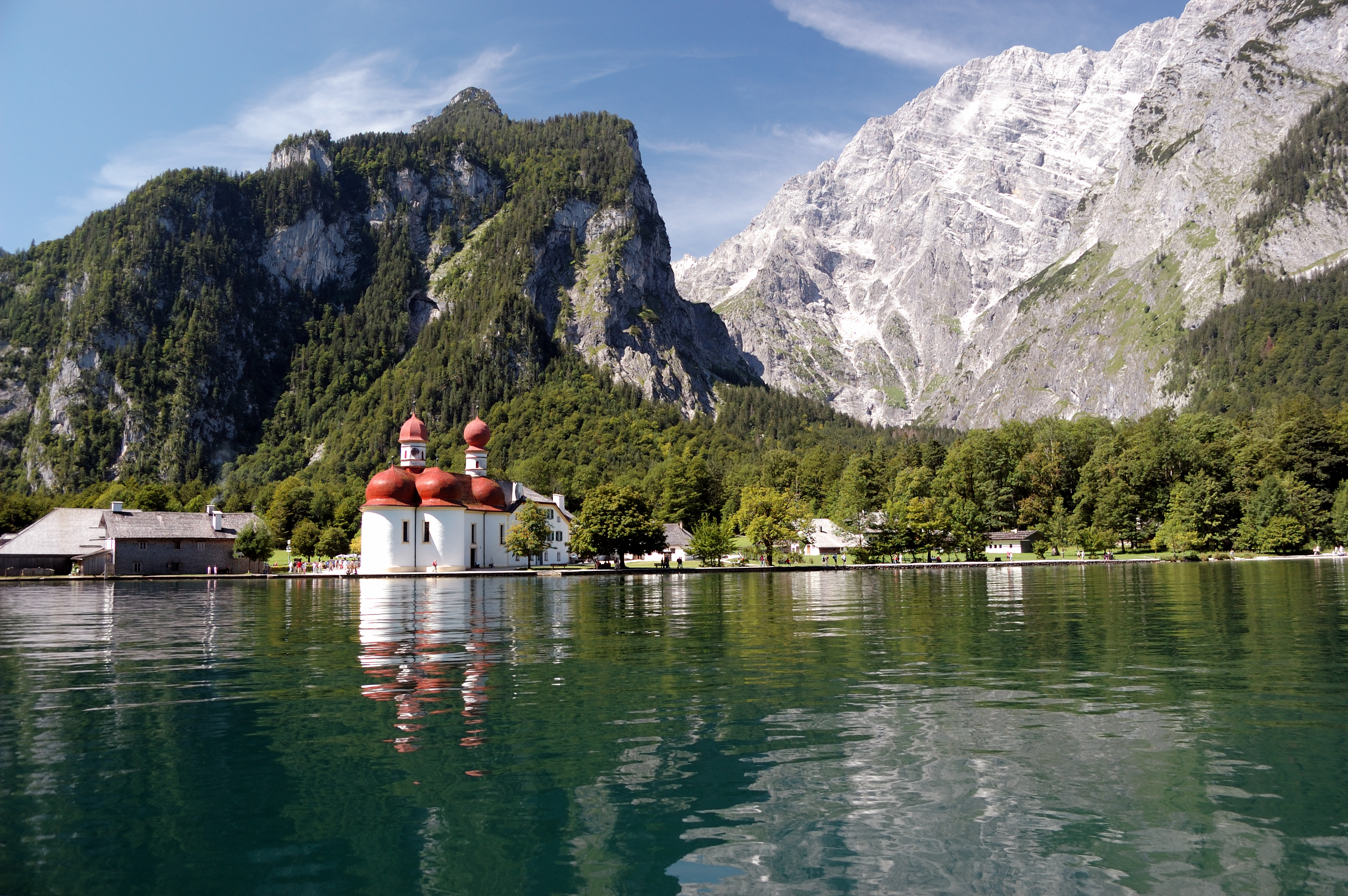
Bavaria is the German state with the most visitors.

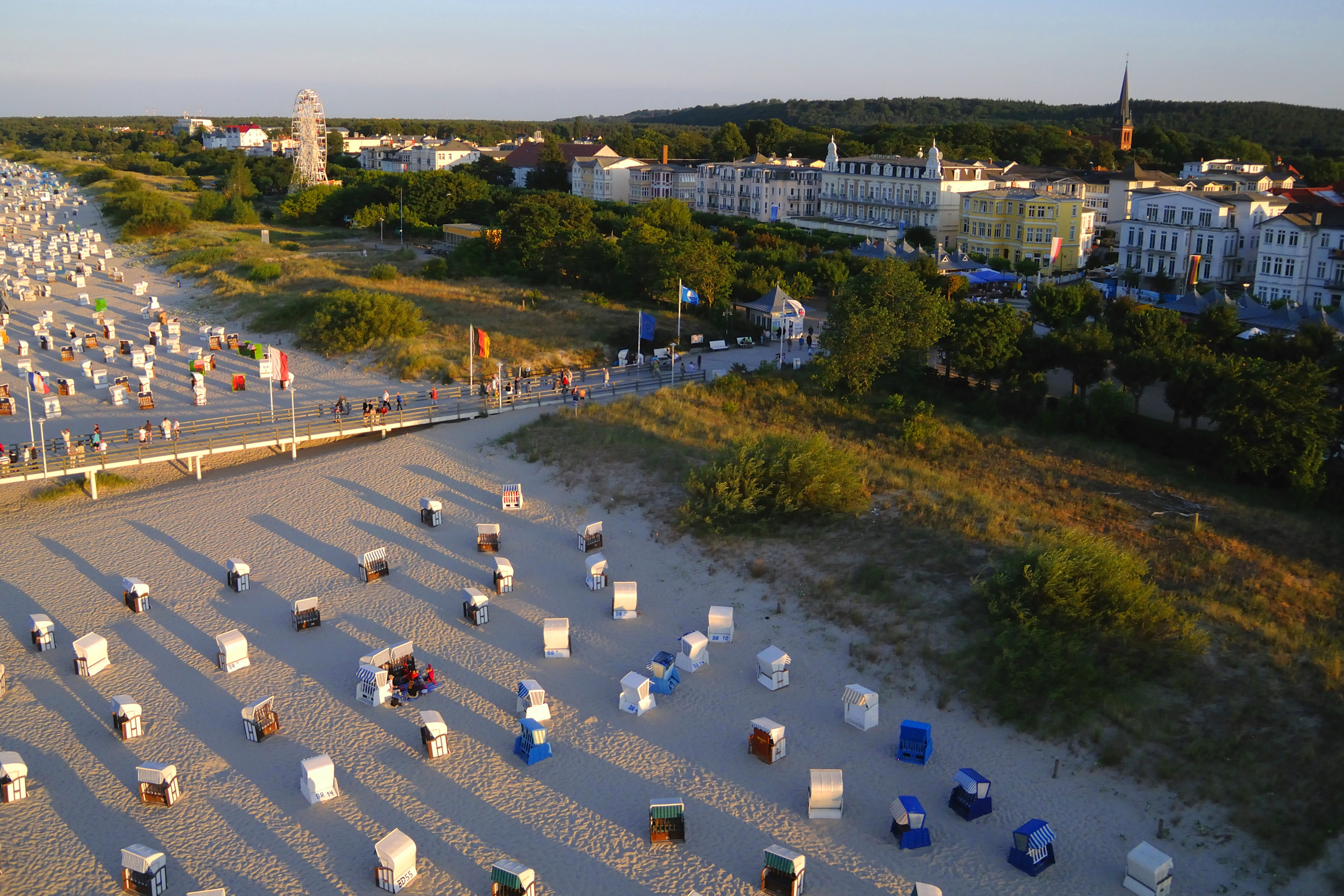
Mecklenburg-Vorpommern with its beaches at the Baltic Sea has the highest density of tourists. It is favourably located between Germany's major cities Berlin and Hamburg.

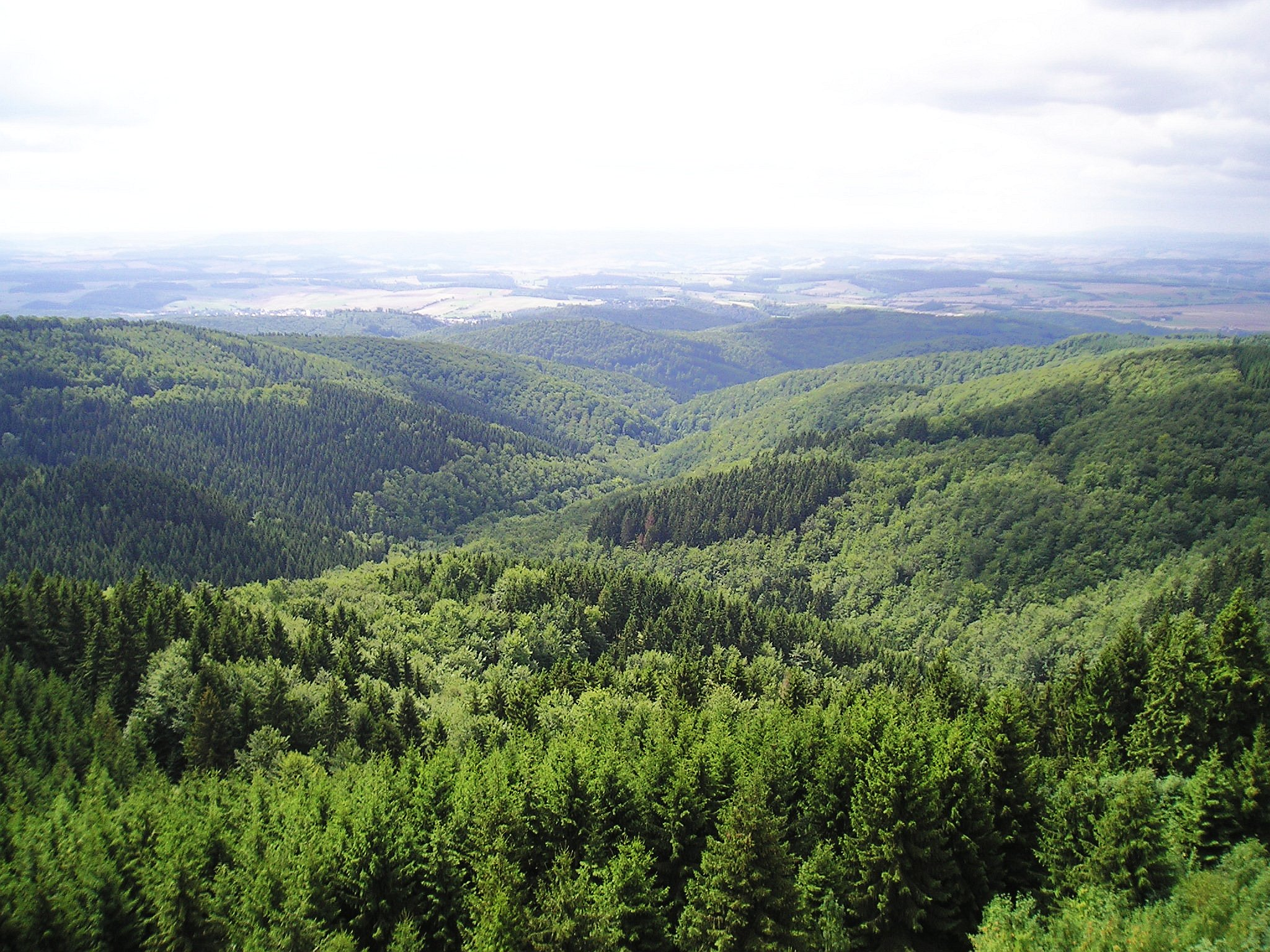
The Harz with its rugged terrain extends across parts of Lower Saxony, Saxony-Anhalt, and Thuringia and has a long history of mining and being a seat of German political power, represented in the Unesco world heritage sites of Goslar and Quedlinburg.

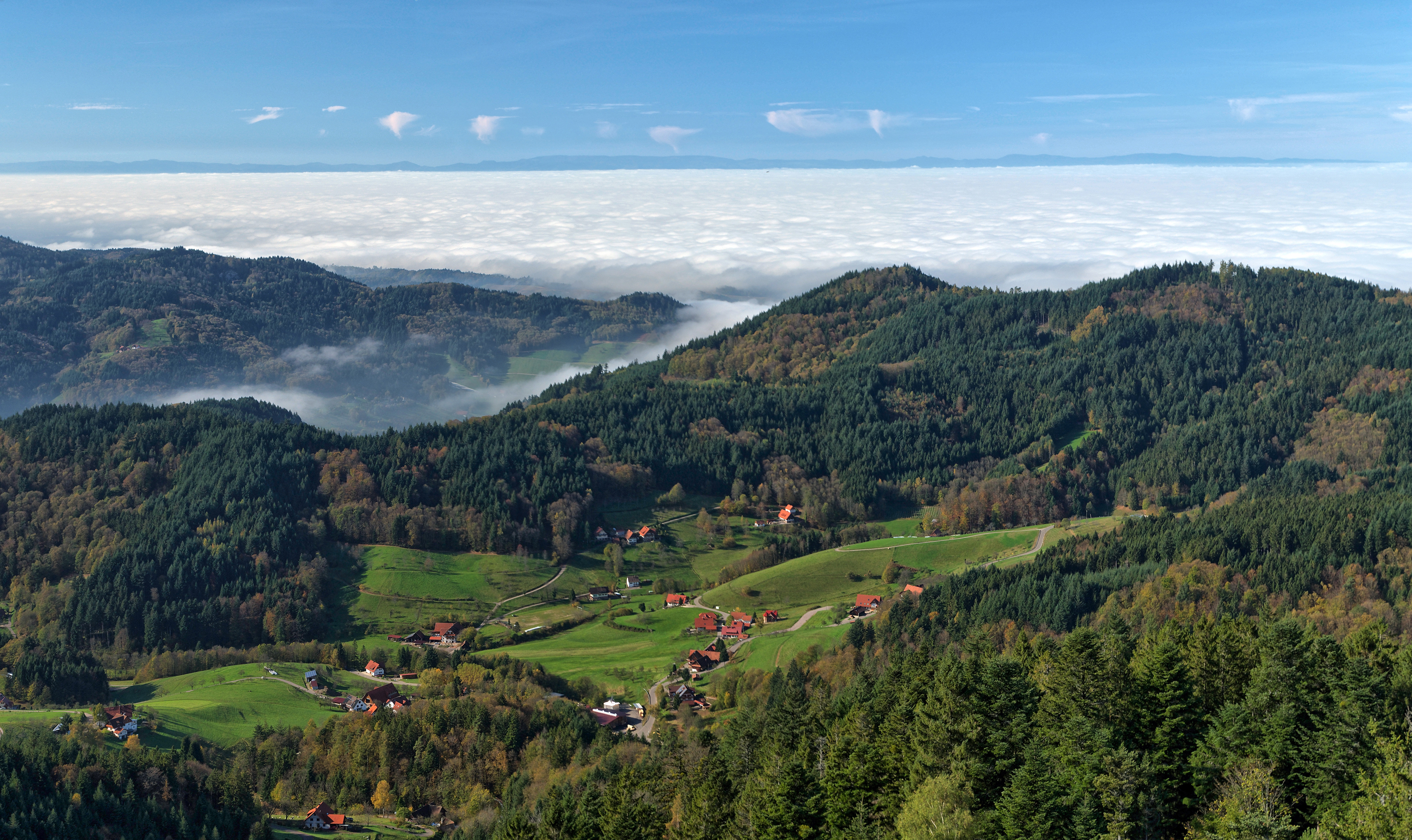
The Black Forest is a large forested mountain range in the state of Baden-Württemberg in southwest Germany, bounded by the Rhine Valley to the west and south and close to the borders with France and Switzerland.

The table below shows the distribution of national and international visitor nights spent in each of the sixteen states of Germany in 2017.

Germany overall had 459 million visitor nights in 2017, of which 83 million were of foreign guests. With 94.3 million nights spent in hotels, hostels or clinics, Bavaria has the most visitors. With 18.4 nights per inhabitant, Mecklenburg-Vorpommern has the highest density of tourists per population (German average: 5.5 nights per inhabitant).

State	Nr. of nights in 2017 in million	of whom foreign visitors in million	nights per inhabitant
Germany	459	83	5.5
Baden-Württemberg	52.9	11.3	4.8
Bavaria	94.3	19.1	7.2
Berlin	31.1	13.9	8.7
Brandenburg	13.0	0.96	5.2
Bremen	2.4	0.49	3.6
Hamburg	13.8	3.4	7.6
Hesse	34.1	7.6	5.4
Mecklenburg-Vorpommern	29.7	1.0	18.4
Lower Saxony	43.4	3.7	5.4
North Rhine-Westphalia	51.5	11.0	2.8
Rhineland-Palatinate	22.2	5.2	5.4
Saarland	3.0	0.46	3.0
Saxony	19.5	2.0	4.7
Saxony-Anhalt	8.1	0.63	3.6
Schleswig-Holstein	29.8	2.0	10.3
Thuringia	9.9	0.62	4.6

Most visitors arriving to Germany on short-term basis are from the following countries of nationality:

Rank	Country	2024
1	The Netherlands	5,261,187
2	Switzerland	3,326,404
3	United States	3,226,355
4	United Kingdom	2,376,674
5	Austria	2,140,298
6	France	1,855,356
7	Italy	1,581,377
8	Denmark	1,530,693
9	Poland	1,476,207
10	Belgium	1,469,679

=== Surveys ===
The official body for tourism in Germany is the German National Tourist Board (GNTB), represented worldwide by National Tourist Offices in 29 countries. Surveys by the GNTB include perceptions and reasons for holidaying in Germany, which are as follows: culture (75%), outdoors/countryside (59%), cities (59%), cleanliness (47%), security (41%), modernity (36%), good hotels (35%), good gastronomy/cuisine (34%), good accessibility (30%), cosmopolitanism/hospitality (27%), good shopping opportunities (21%), exciting nightlife (17%) and good price/performance ratio (10%) (multiple answers were possible).

== Countryside ==
=== Health ===
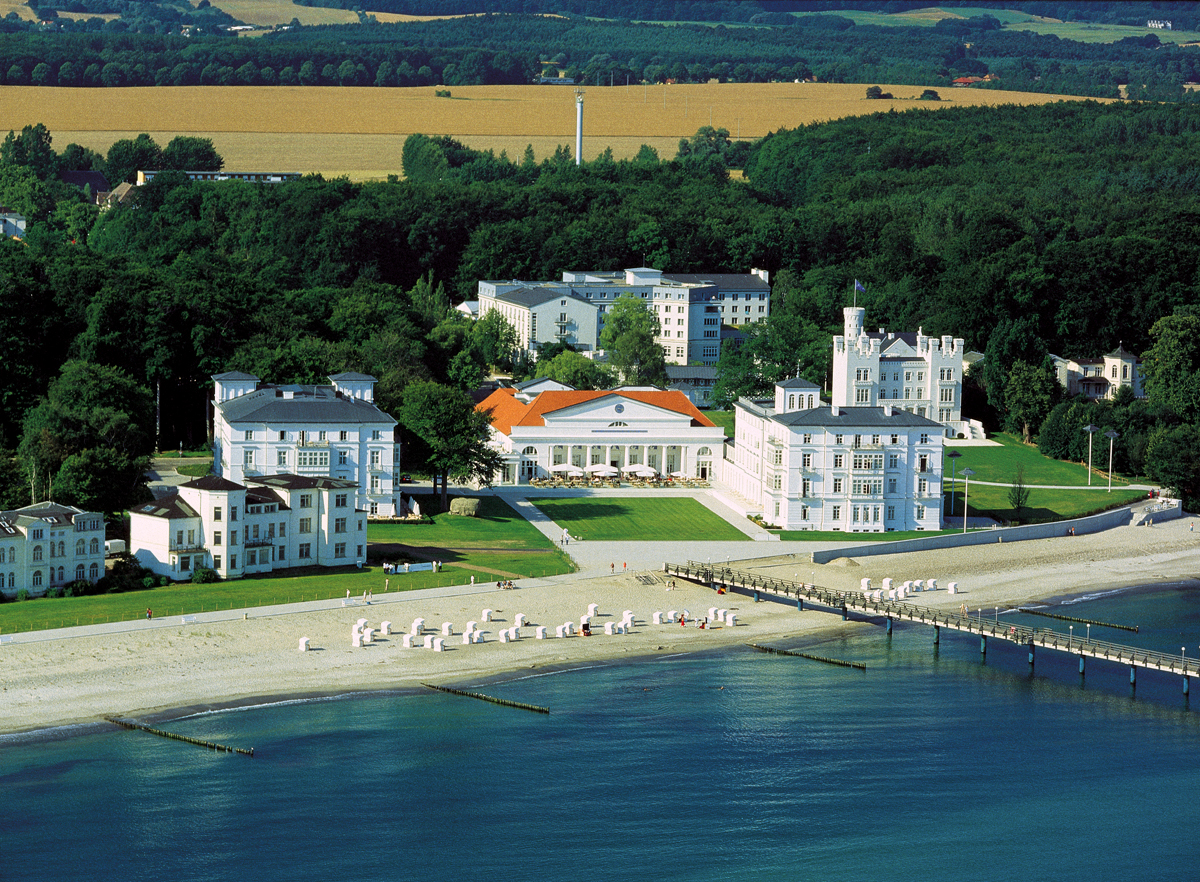
Mecklenburg-Vorpommern with its beaches at the Baltic Sea has many seside resorts, like the pictured Grand Hotel Heiligendamm, built between 1793 and 1870

About 242 million nights, or two-thirds of all nights spent in hotels in Germany, are spent in spa towns. Germany is well known for health tourism, with many of the numerous spa towns having been established at a hot spring, offering convalescence (German: Kur) or preventive care by means of mineral water and/or other spa treatment. Spa towns and seaside resorts carry official designations such as Mineral and mud spas (Mineral- und Moorbäder), Healthy climate resorts (Heilklimatische Kurorte), Kneipp cure resorts (Kneippkurorte = water therapy resorts), Seaside resorts (Seebäder), Climatic resorts (Luftkurorte), and Recreation resorts (Erholungsorte). The largest and most well known resorts also have casinos, most notably at Bad Wiessee, Baden-Baden (Kurhaus), Wiesbaden (Kurhaus), Aachen, Travemünde and Westerland (Kurhaus).

=== Regions ===
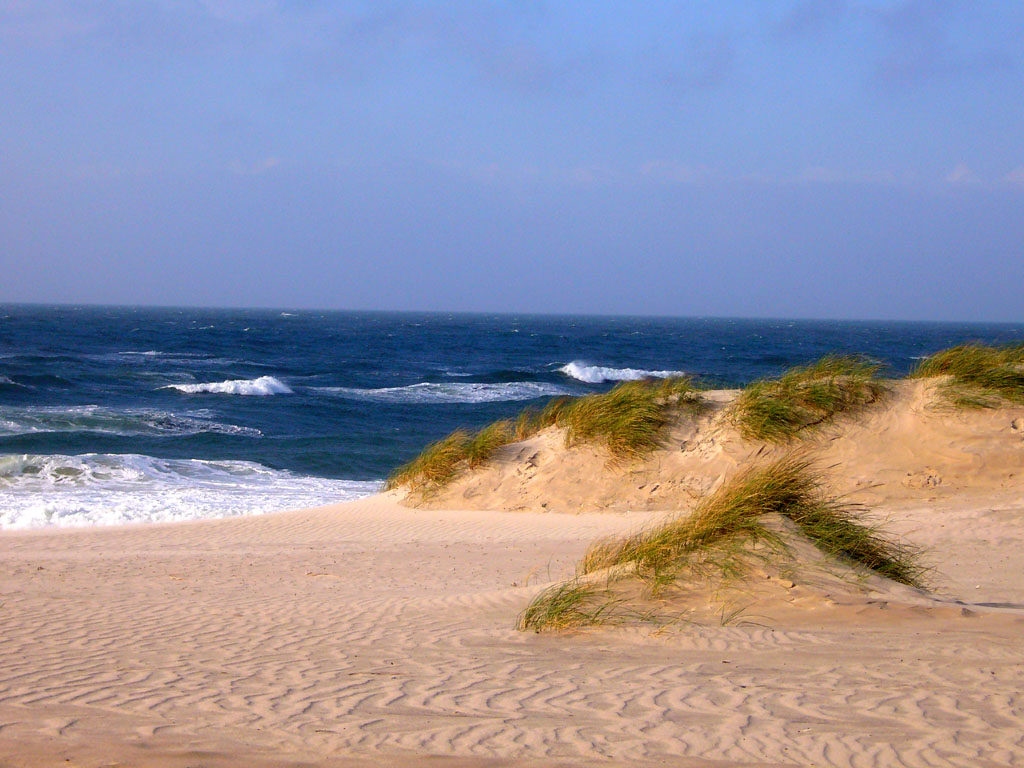
Dune on the North Frisian island of Sylt

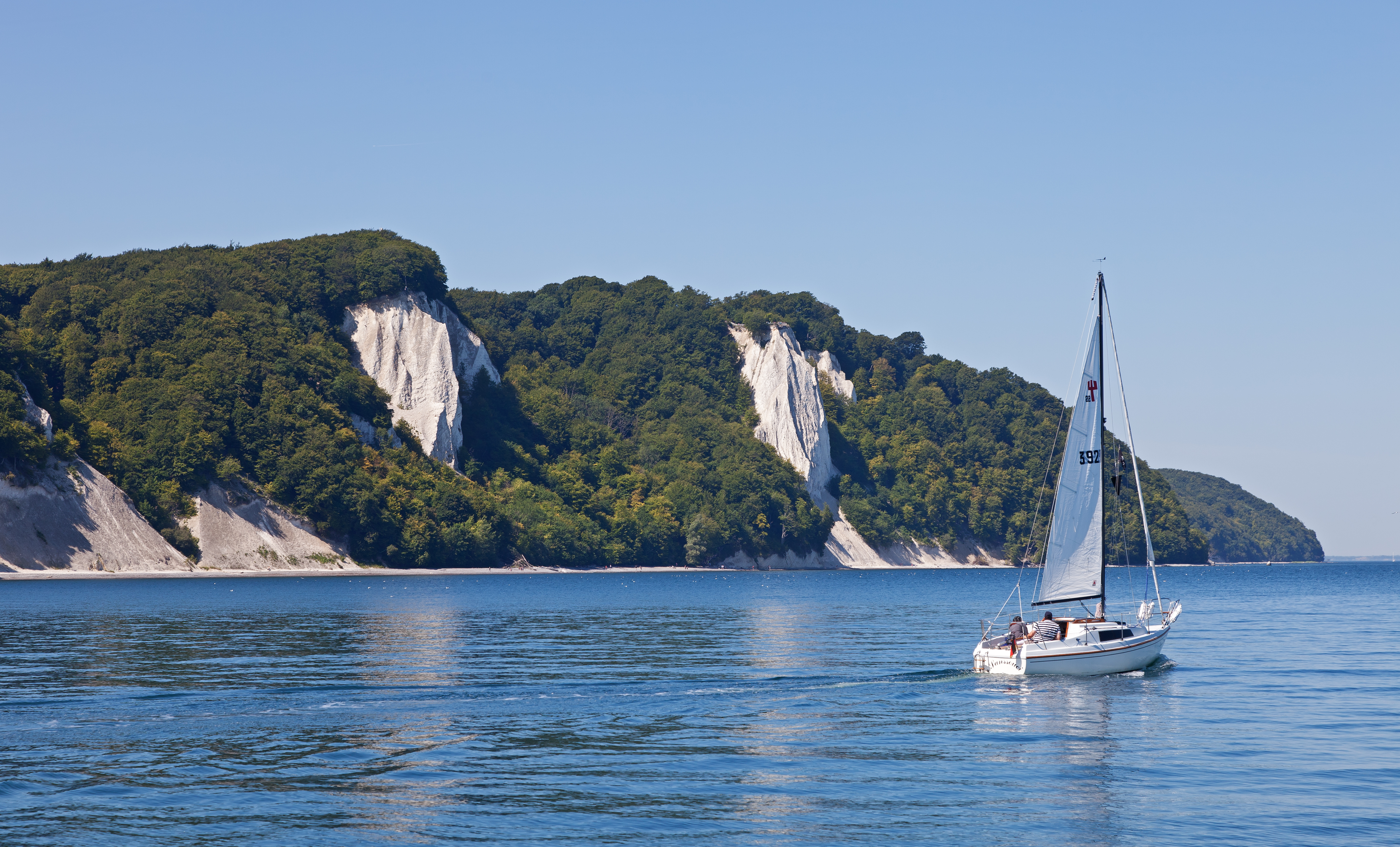
Stubbenkammer on the Baltic island of Rügen

The most visited tourist regions in Germany are the East Frisian and North Frisian Islands, the Baltic Sea coasts of Holstein, Mecklenburg and Vorpommern, the Rhine Valley, the Bavarian and Black Forest, and the Bavarian Alps.

The table below shows the five most visited rural districts in 2008:

rank	district	# of nights in 2008
1	Nordfriesland	6.96 million
2	Rügen	5.57 million
3	Oberallgäu	5.29 million
4	Ostholstein	5.27 million
5	Breisgau-Hochschwarzwald	4.41 million

Other popular regions include

- in the north: Usedom, Holstein Switzerland, the Lüneburg Heath, Harz and Mecklenburg Lake District
- in the west: Teutoburg Forest, Sauerland, Eifel and the Moselle Valley
- in the east: Saxon Switzerland, Thuringian Forest, Ore Mountains and the Elbe Valley
- in the south: Taunus, Spessart, Rhön, Odenwald and Allgäu.

=== Theme routes ===
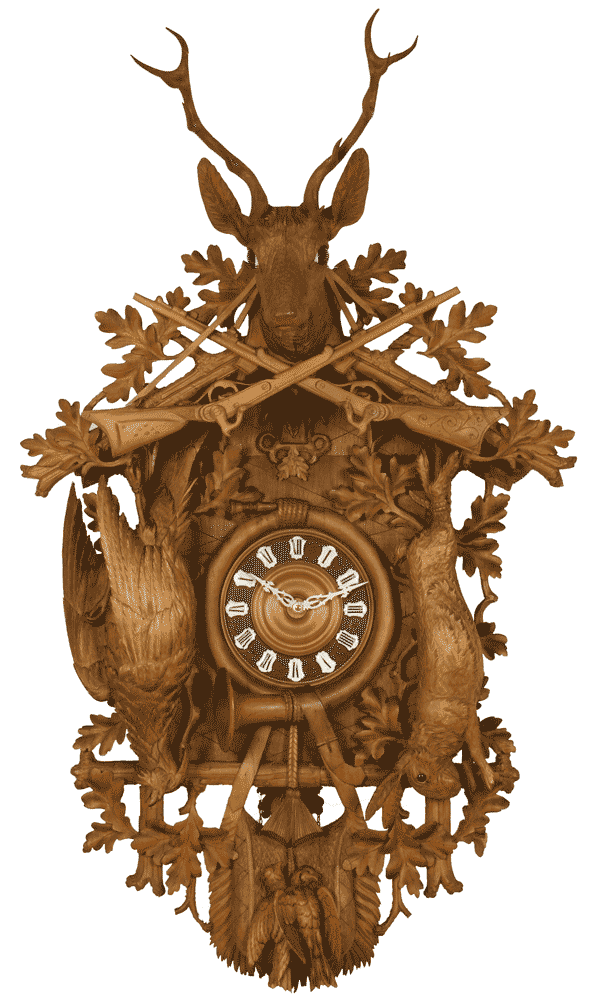
A cuckoo clock, symbol of the Black Forest

Since the 1930s, local and regional governments have set up various theme routes, to help visitors get to know a specific region and its cultural or scenic qualities. The table below shows some of the most prominent theme routes. Other popular German theme routes include parts of the European Route of Brick Gothic and European Route of Industrial Heritage, the Harz-Heide Road, Bertha Benz Memorial Route and Bergstrasse.

List of theme routes (incomplete)
Route	Established	Theme	Length
German Wine Road (Deutsche Weinstraße)	1935	Palatinate wine route	85 km
German Avenue Road (Deutsche Alleenstraße)	1993	Tree-sided avenues and lush countrysides	2900 km
Romantic Road (Romantische Straße)	1950	Romanticism	366 km
Black Forest High Road (Schwarzwaldhochstraße)	1952	Black Forest	60 km
Castle Road (Burgenstraße)	1954	Castles in Germany	1,000 km
Road of Weser Renaissance (Straße der Weserrenaissance)		Weser Renaissance	350 km
Romanesque Road (Straße der Romanik)	1993	Romanesque architecture	1,195 km
German Ferries Route	2004	Fords, ferries, bridges and tunnels	250 km
German Timber-Frame Road	1990	Timber framing (Fachwerk)	3,000 km
German Clock Road (Deutsche Uhrenstrasse)		Cuckoo clock Manufacturers, clock-face paintings workshops, museums, Black Forest and Baar villages, landscapes	320 km
Industrial Heritage Trail (Route der Industriekultur)		Industrial heritage of the Ruhr area	400 km
German Fairy Tale Route (Deutsche Märchenstraße)		Fairy tales and legends of the Brothers Grimm	600 km

=== Winter sport ===
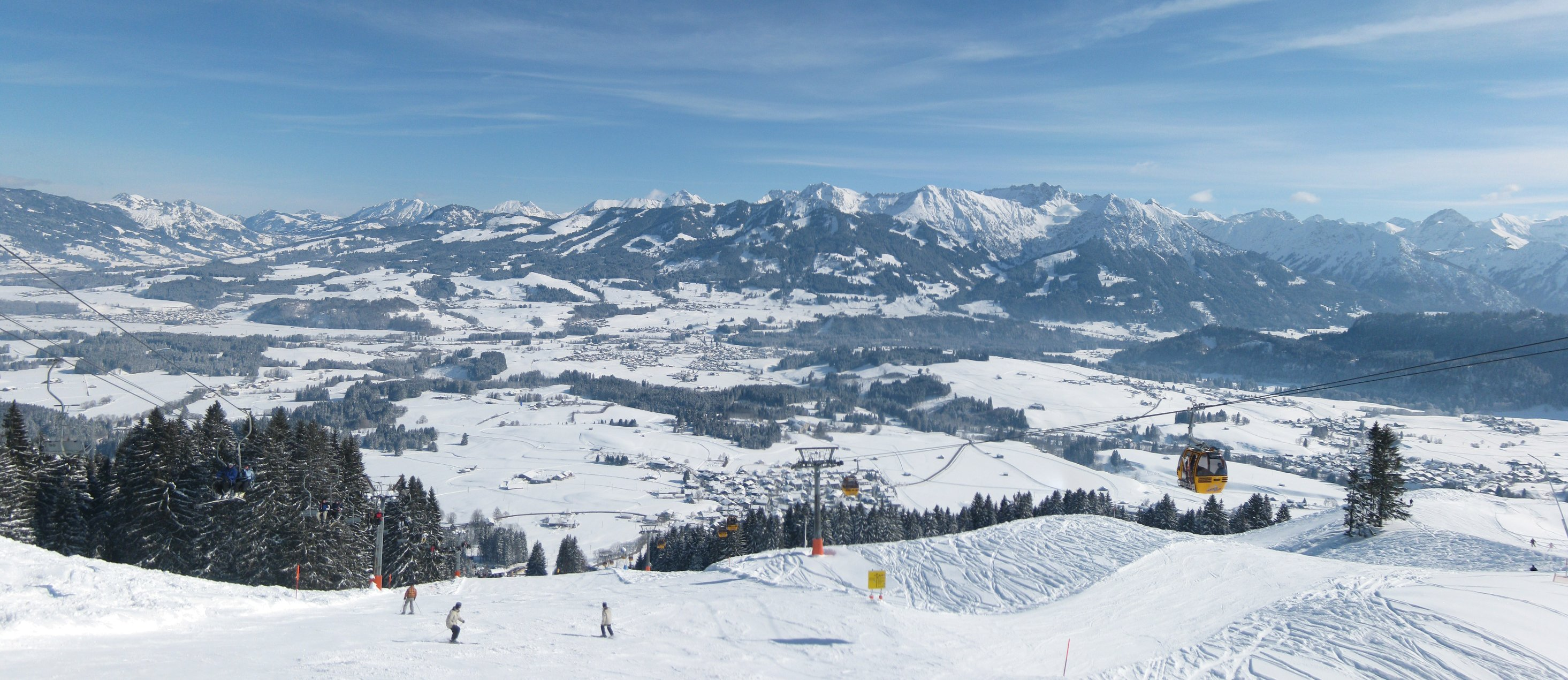
View of Bolsterlang, Oberallgäu

The main winter sport regions in Germany are the Bavarian Alps and Northern Limestone Alps, as well as the Ore Mountains, Harz Mountains, Fichtel Mountains and Bavarian Forest within the Central Uplands. First class winter sport infrastructure is available for alpine skiing and snowboarding, bobsledding and cross-country skiing.

In most regions, winter sports are limited to the winter months November to February. During the Advent season, many German towns and cities host Christmas markets.

== Cities ==
In terms of numbers of overnight stays, travel to the twelve largest cities in Germany more than doubled between 1995 and 2005, the largest increase of any travel destination. This increase mainly arises from growth of cultural tourism, often in conjunction with educational or business travel. Consequently, the provision and supply of more and higher standards of cultural, entertainment, hospitality, gastronomic, and retail services also attract more international guests.

The table below shows the ten most visited cities in Germany in 2012. Other cities and towns with over 1 million nights per year are Rostock, Hannover, Bremen, Cuxhaven, Bonn, Freiburg, Münster, Lübeck, Wiesbaden, Essen and Regensburg.

Berlin	32.9m
Munich	17.1m
Hamburg	14.5m
Frankfurt am Main	10.2m
Cologne	6.3m
Düsseldorf	5.0m
Dresden	4.6m
Stuttgart	3.9m
Nuremberg	3.6m
Leipzig	3.4m
Top 10 city destinations in 2018 by nr. of overnight stays (millions)

=== Berlin ===
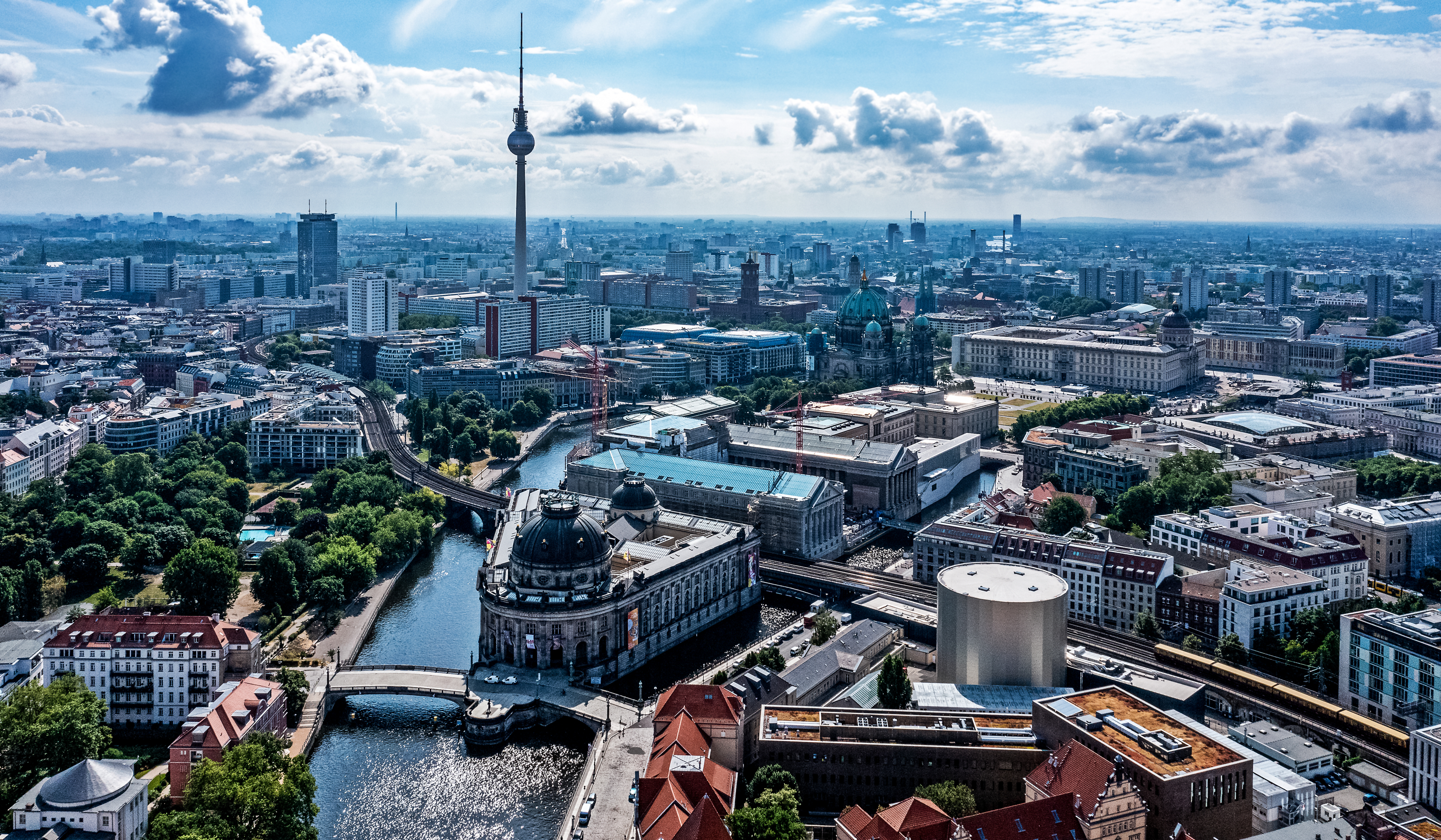
Spree river, Museum Island, Berlin TV Tower and Berlin Palace in the centre of Berlin, Mitte

Berlin has a yearly total of about 135 million day visitors, which puts it in third place among the most-visited city destinations in the European Union. Berlin had 781 hotels with over 125,000 beds in June 2012. The city recorded 20.8 million overnight hotel stays and 9.1 million hotel guests in 2010. In the first half of 2012, there was an increase of over 10% compared to the same period the year before.

=== Munich ===
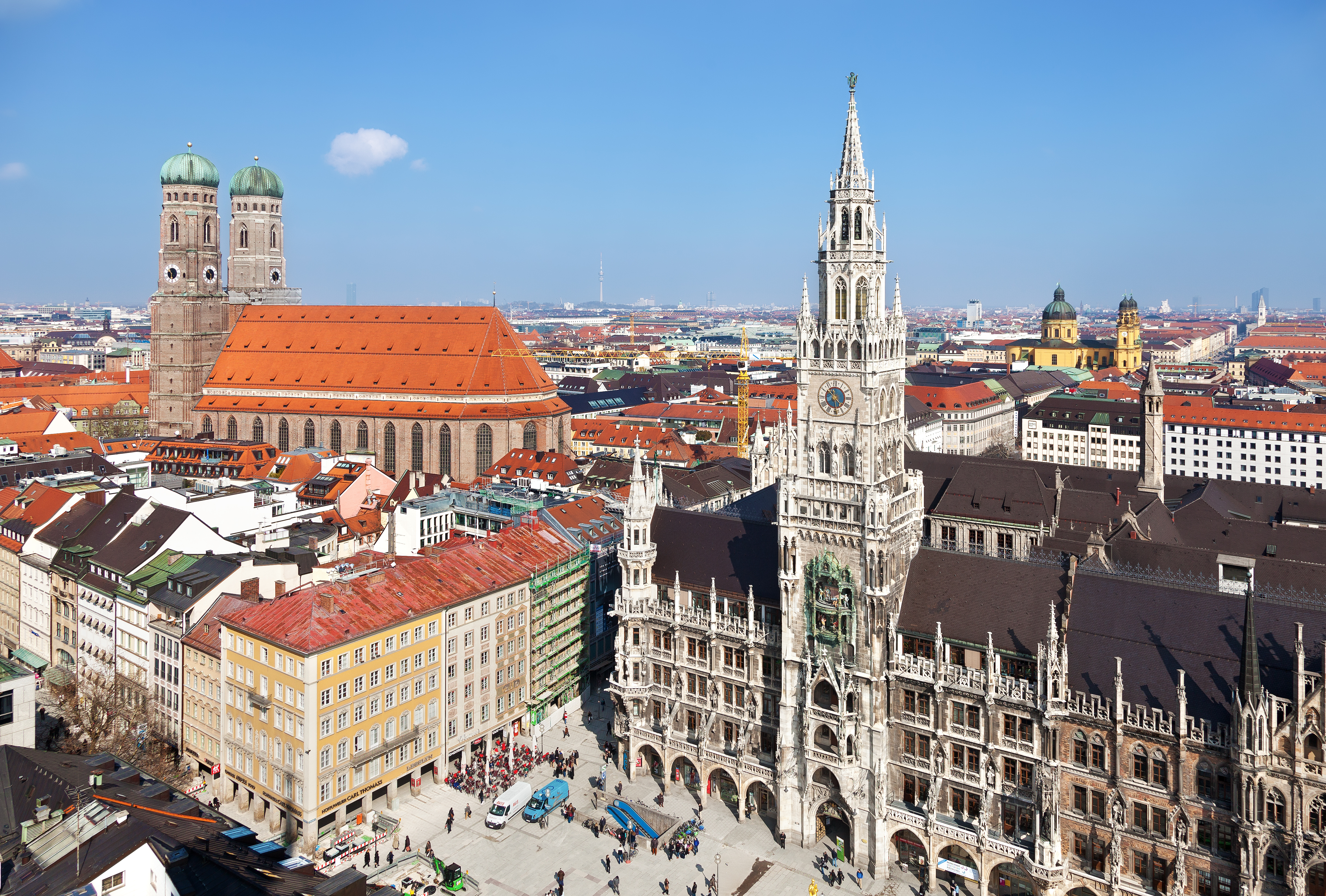
The Marienplatz in the centre of Munich

Munich, the capital of Bavaria, is one of Germany’s most popular tourist destinations.

=== Hamburg ===
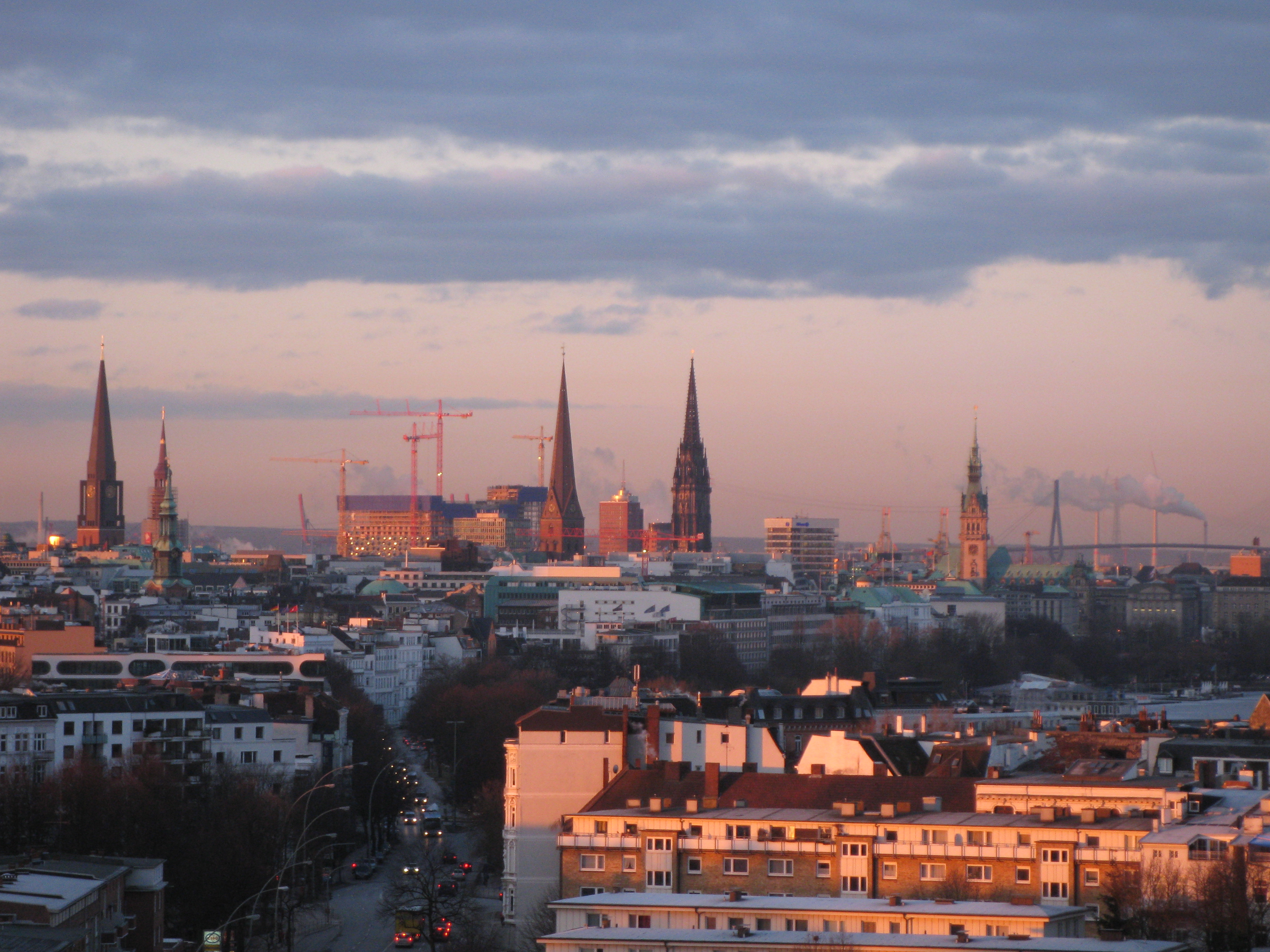
Hamburg is with 5 of the world's 29 tallest churches the city with the greatest number of churches surpassing 100 metres (330 ft) worldwide.

In 2007, more than 3,985,105 visitors with 7,402,423 overnight stays visited Hamburg. The tourism sector employs more than 175,000 people full-time and brings in revenue of €9.3 billion, making the tourism industry a major economic force in the Hamburg Metropolitan Region. Hamburg has one of the fastest-growing tourism industries in Germany. From 2001 to 2007, the overnight stays in the city increased by 55.2% (Berlin +52.7%, Mecklenburg-Western Pomerania +33%).

A typical Hamburg visit includes a tour of the city hall and the grand church St. Michaelis (called the Michel), and visiting the old warehouse district (Speicherstadt) and the harbour promenade (Landungsbrücken). Sightseeing buses connect these points of interest. As Hamburg is one of the world's largest harbours many visitors take one of the harbour and/or canal boat tours (Große Hafenrundfahrt, Fleetfahrt) which start from the Landungsbrücken. Major destinations also include museums.

The area of Reeperbahn in the quarter St. Pauli is Europe's largest red light district and home of strip clubs, brothels, bars and nightclubs. The Beatles had stints on the Reeperbahn early in their careers. Others prefer the laid-back neighbourhood Schanze with its street cafés, or a barbecue on one of the beaches along the river Elbe. Hamburg's famous zoo, the Tierpark Hagenbeck, was founded in 1907 by Carl Hagenbeck as the first zoo with moated, barless enclosures.

=== Gallery ===
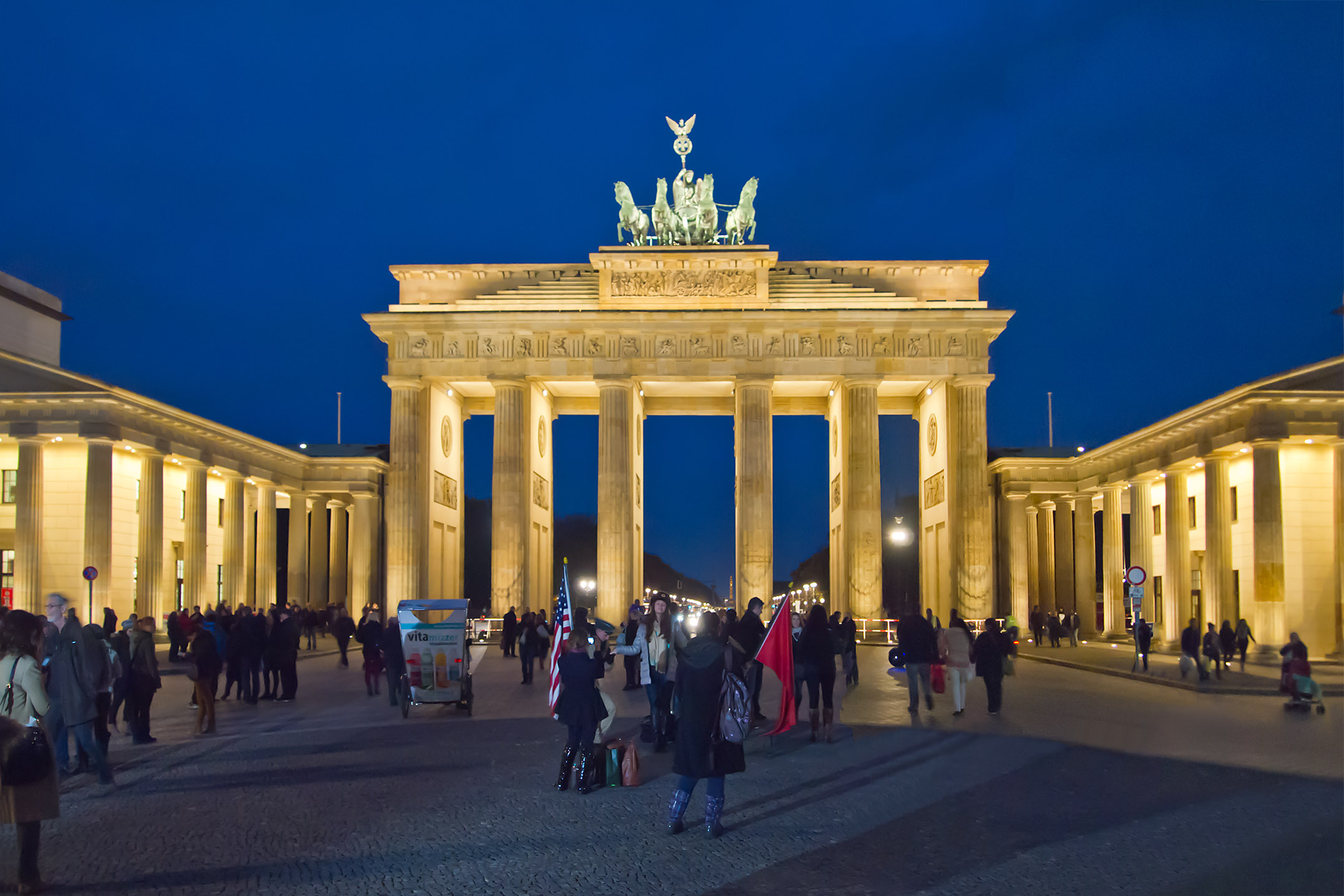
The Brandenburg Gate at night. Berlin is Germany's largest and most visited city.

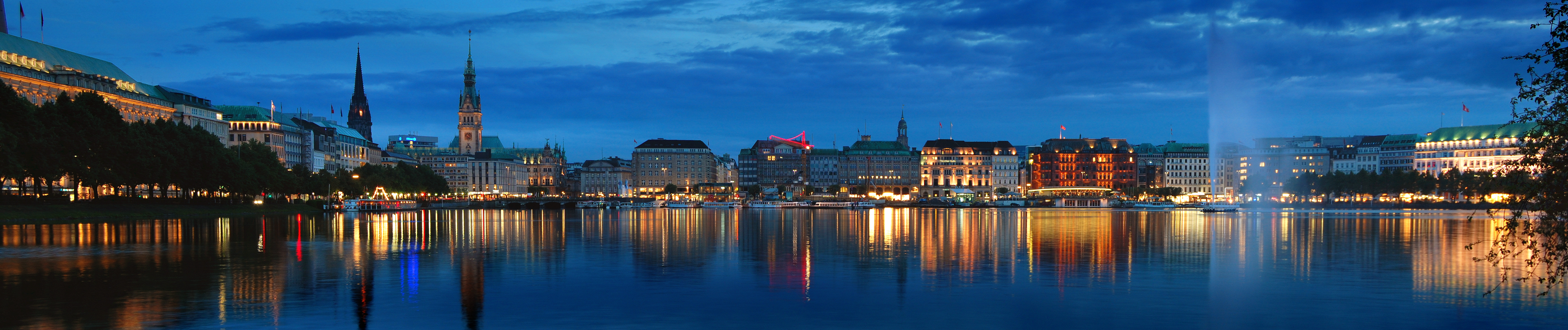
View over Hamburg Binnenalster

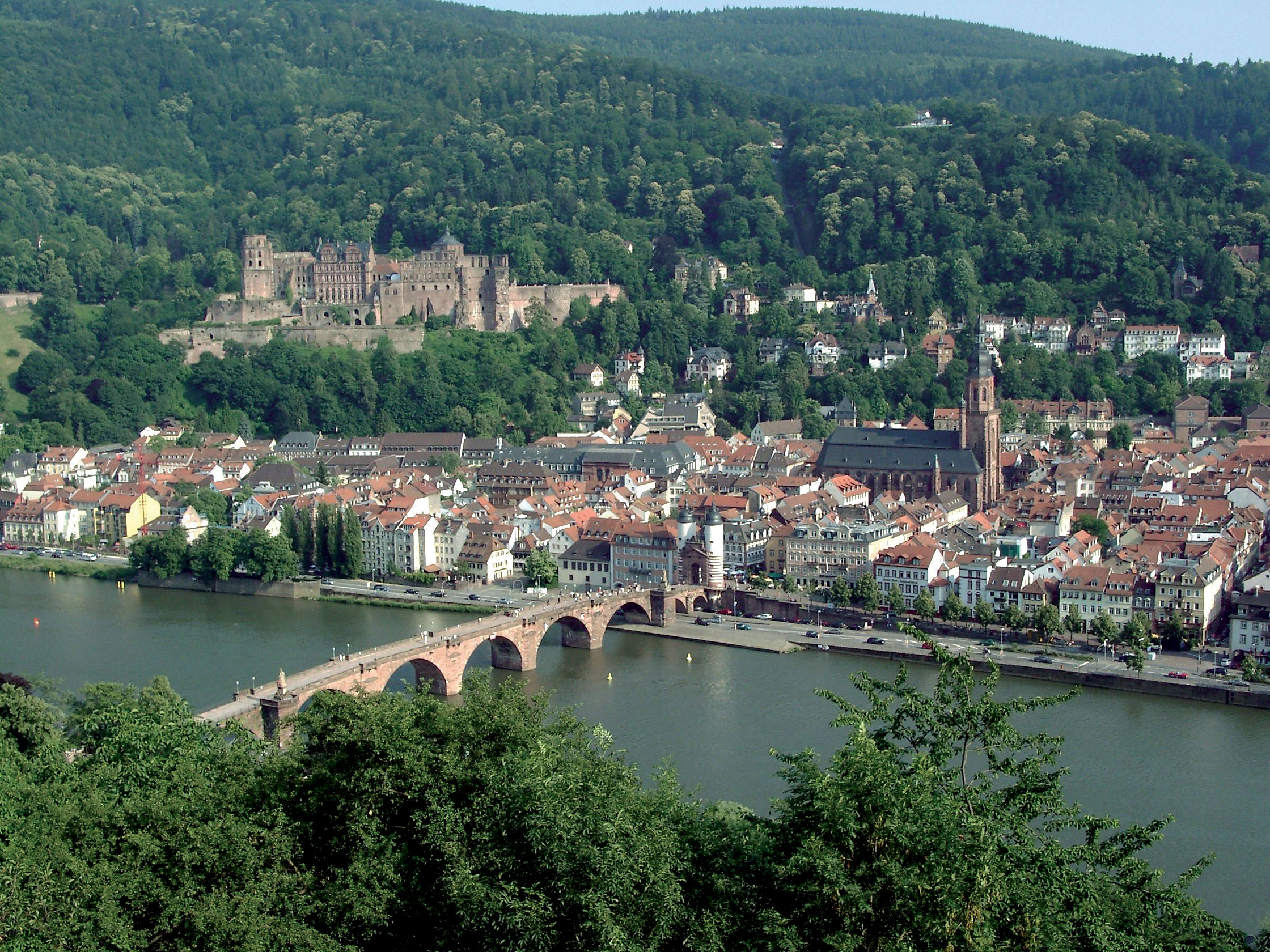
Heidelberg with its famous Castle ruins

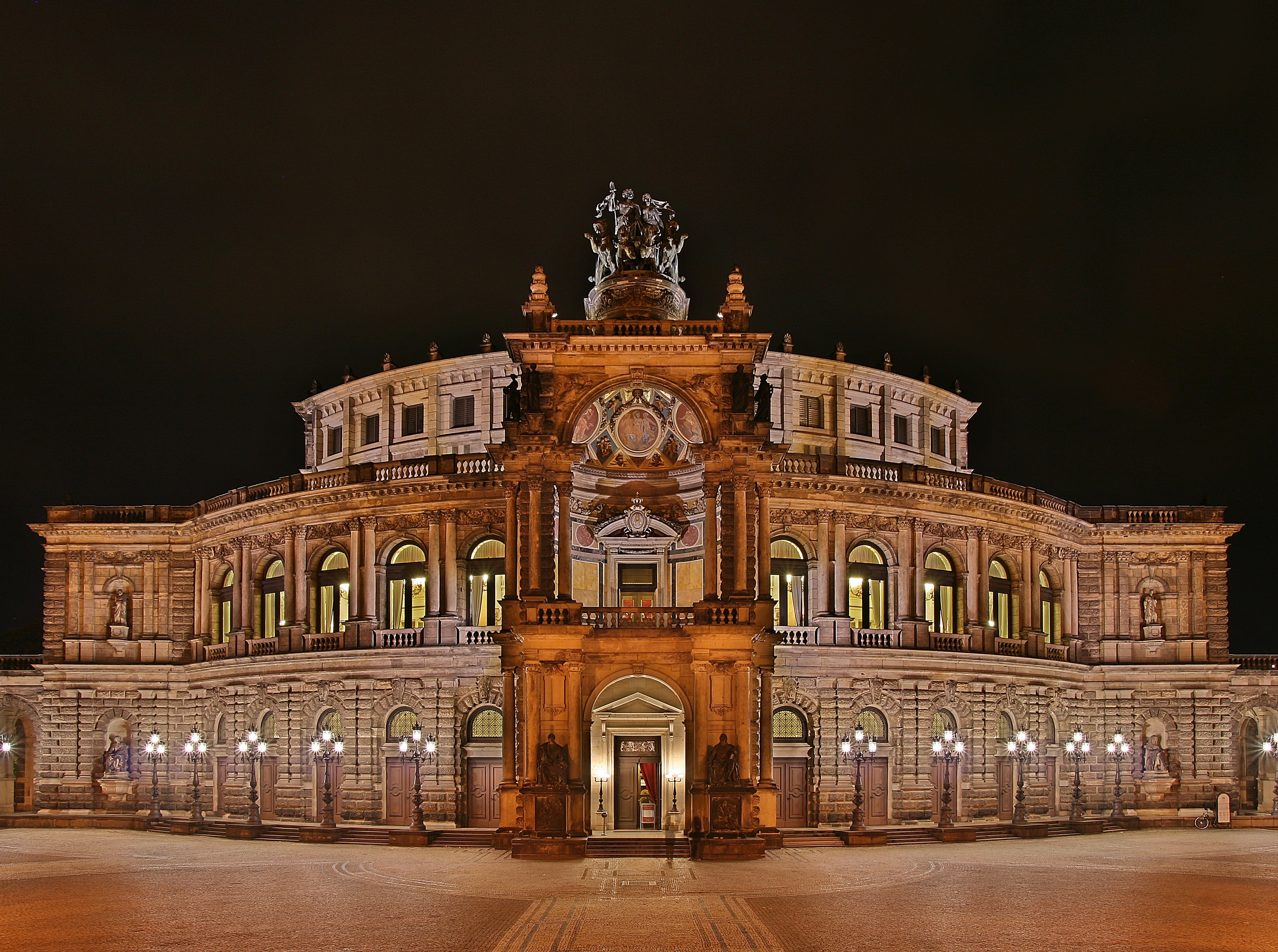
The Semperoper in Dresden is the most famous building of an opera house in Germany.

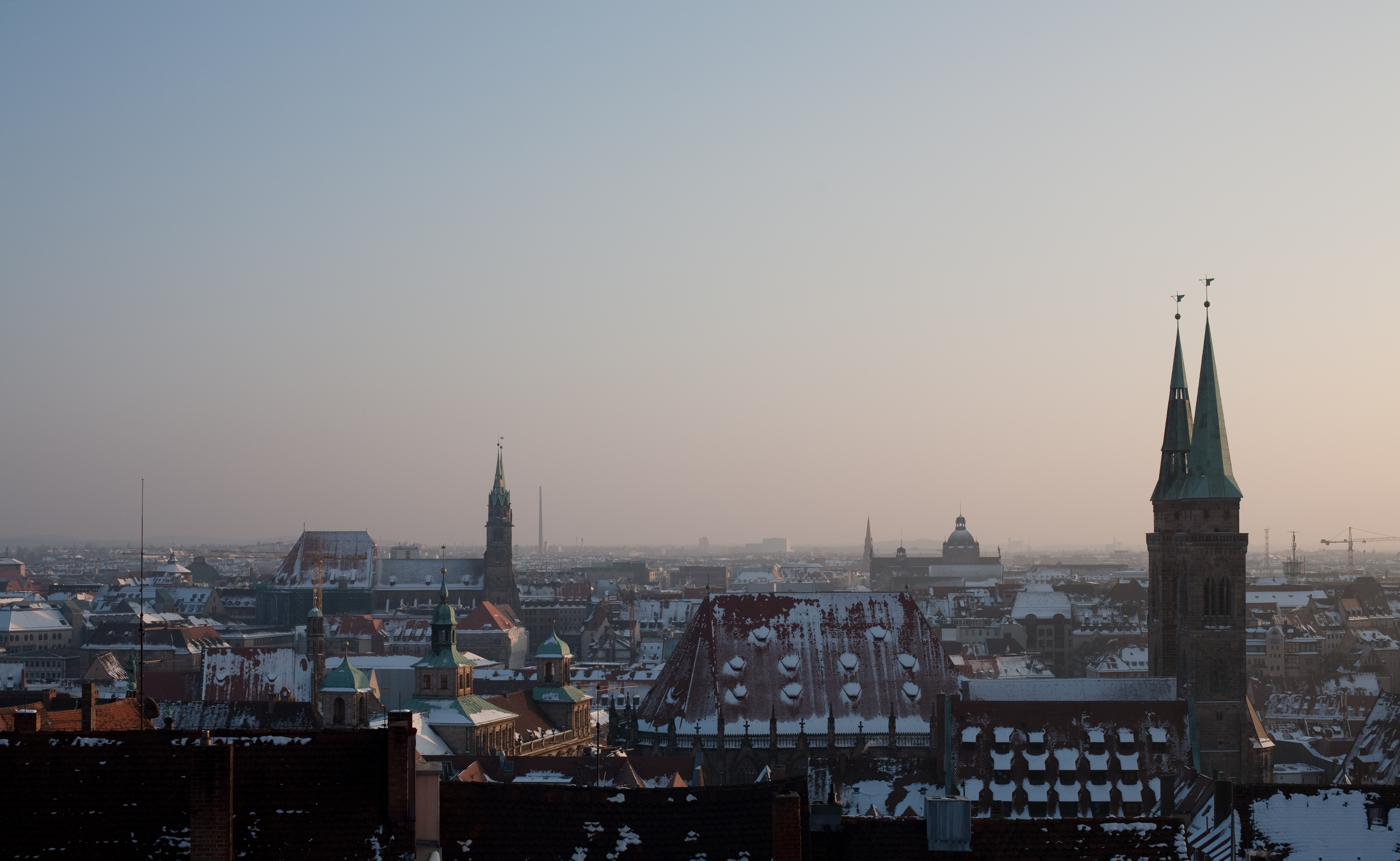
View over Nuremberg's Old Town from the Nuremberg Castle

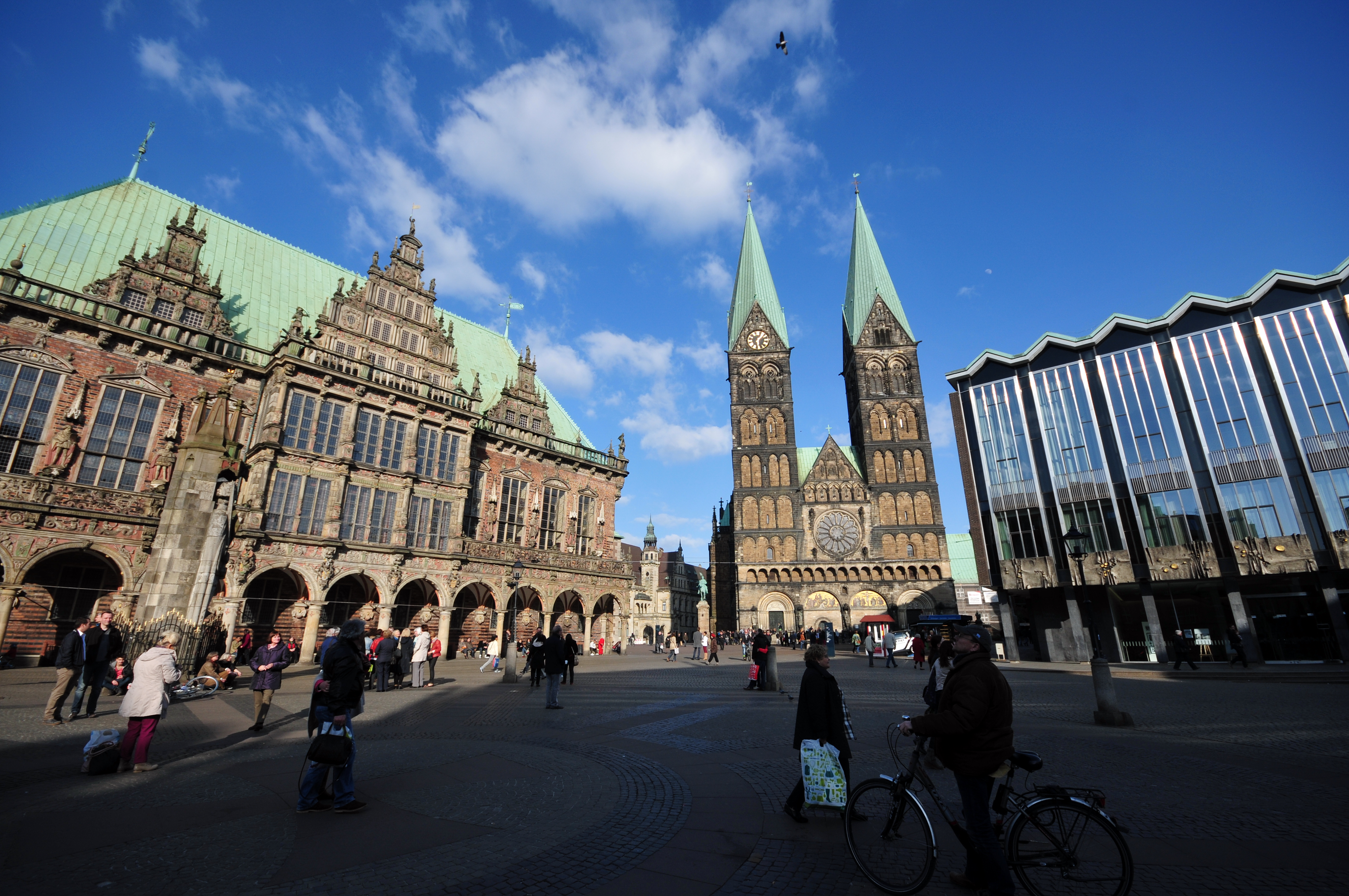
Bremen Market Square in Bremen

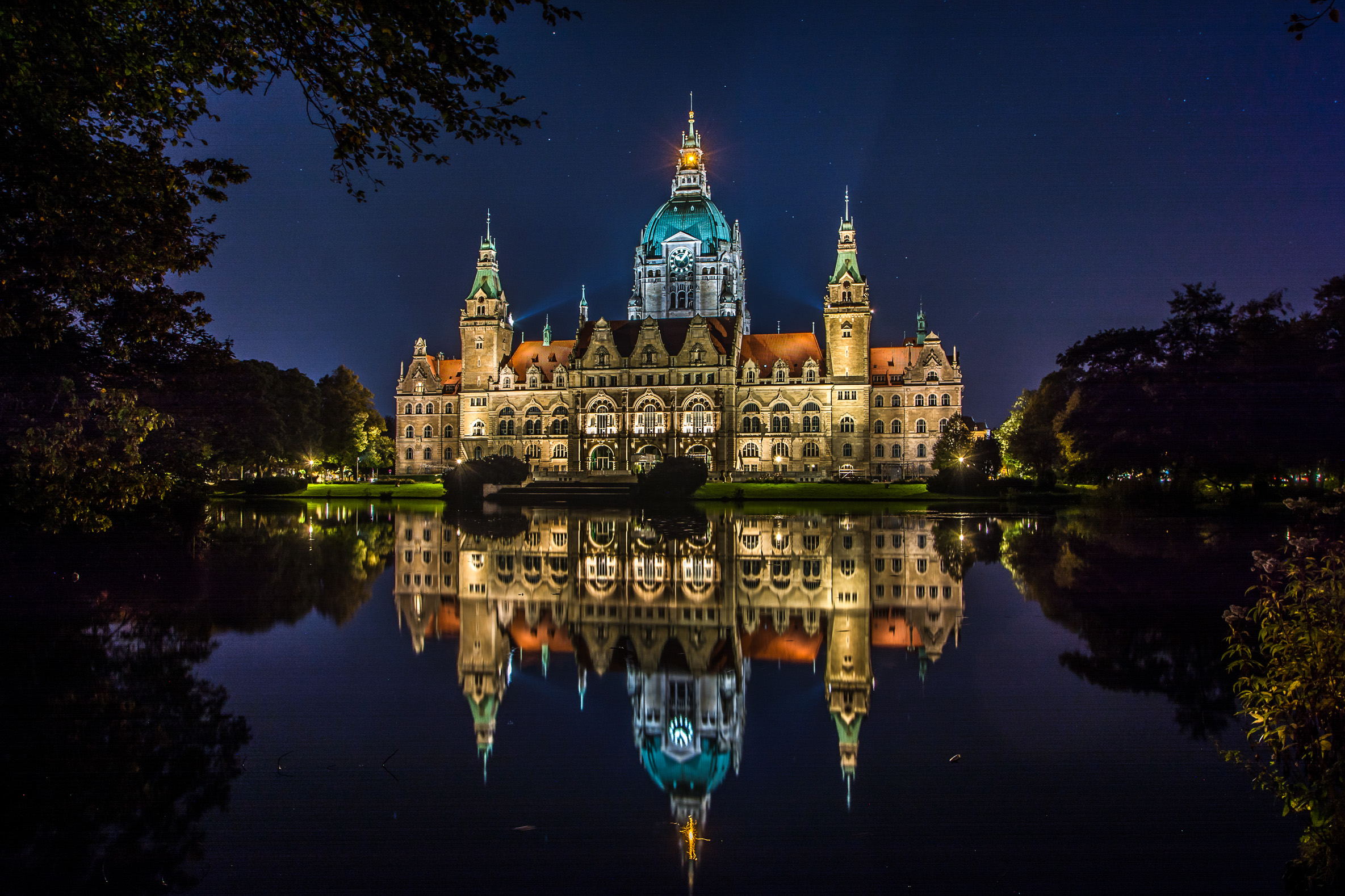
New Town Hall in Hannover

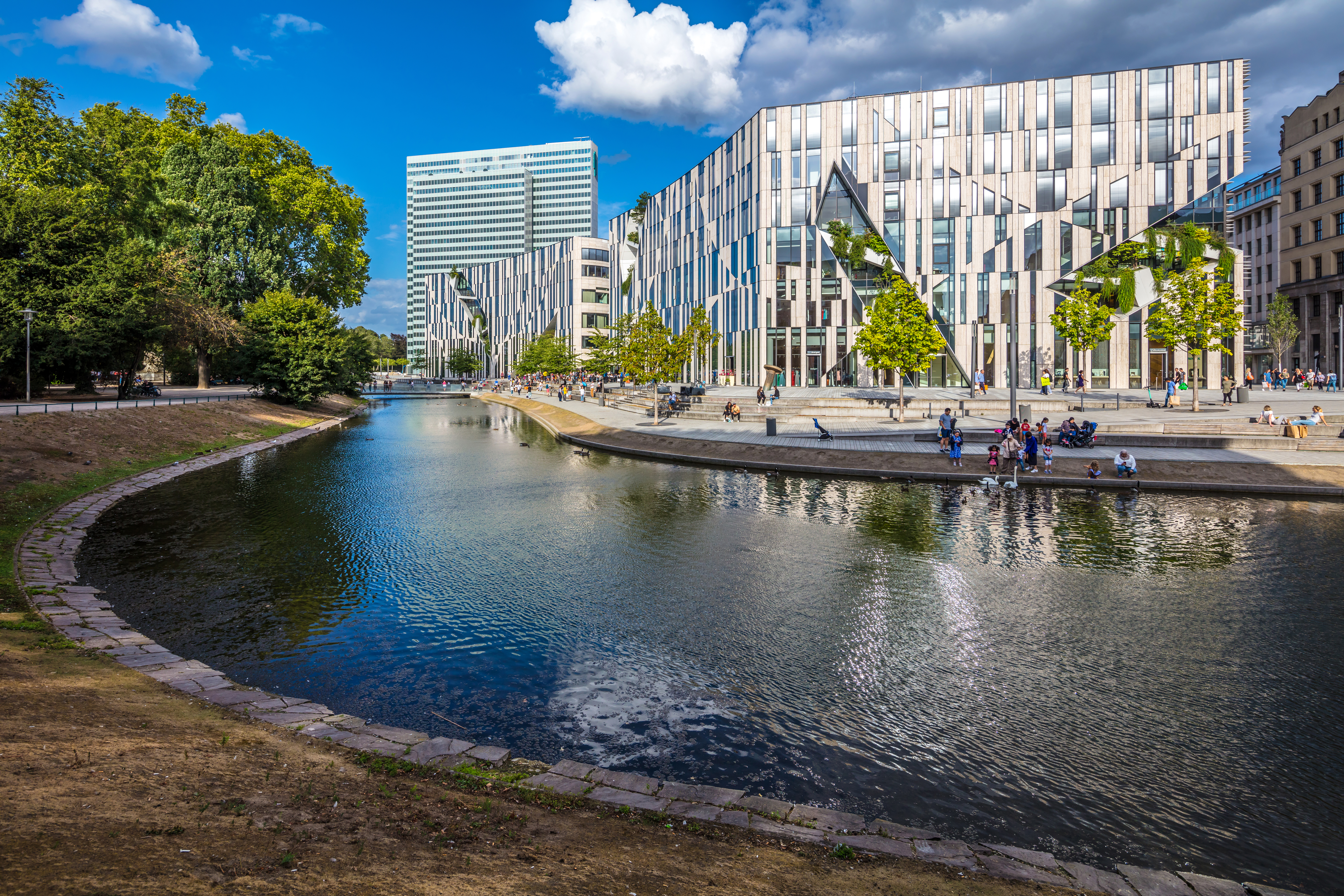
Kö-Bogen in Düsseldorf

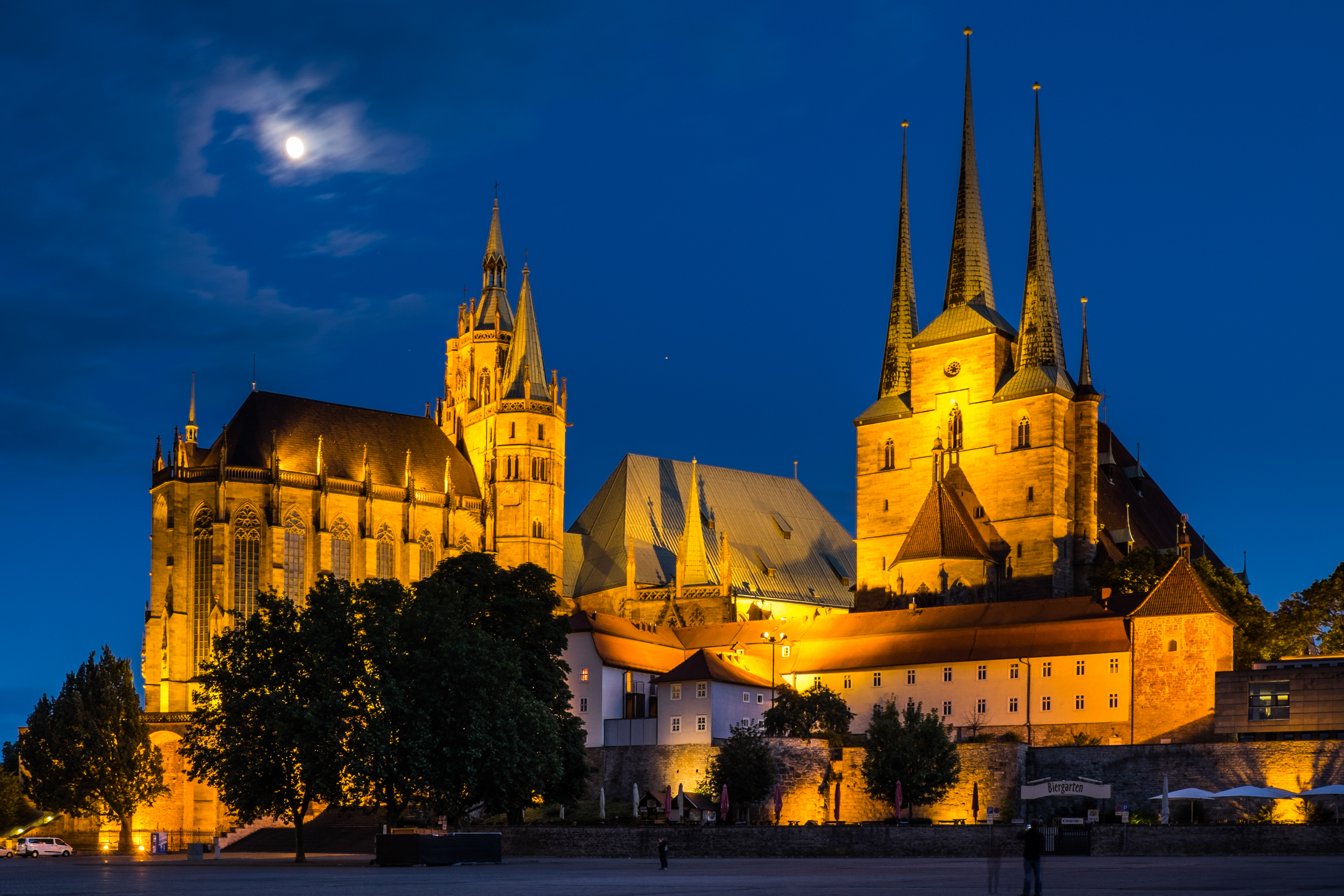
Erfurt Cathedral and St Severus' Church in Erfurt

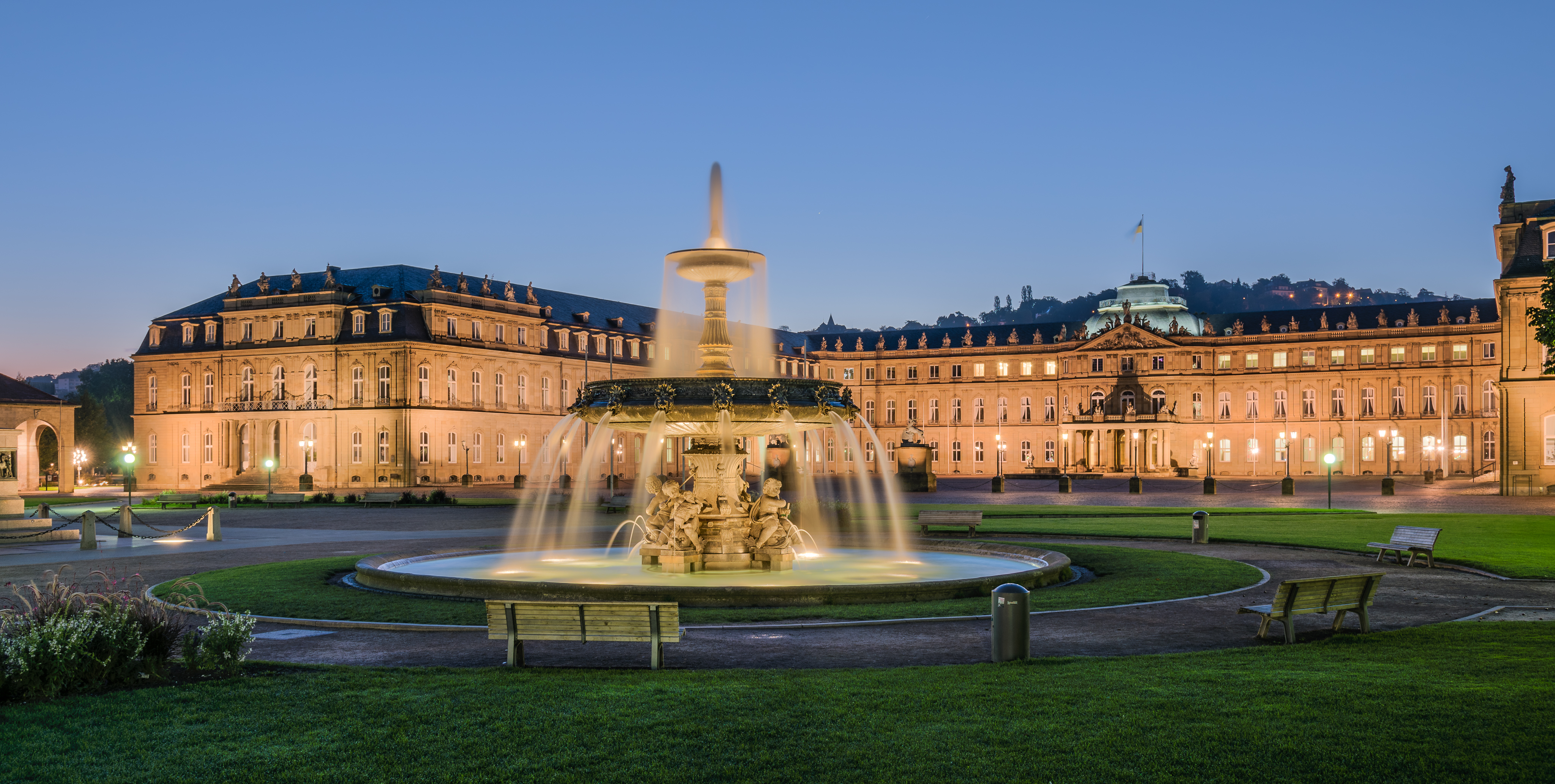
Castle Square with New Palace in Stuttgart

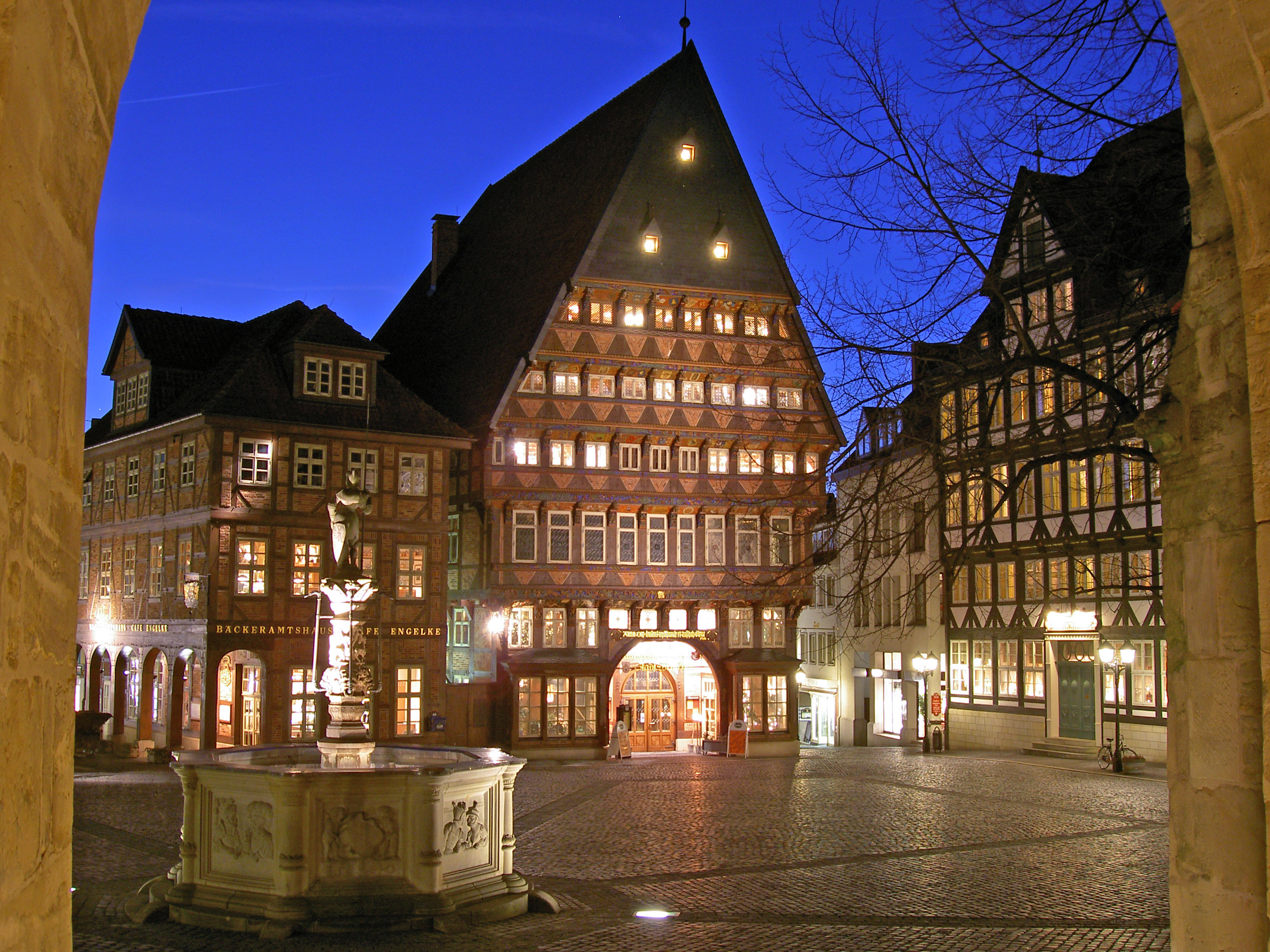
The Butchers' Guild Hall in Hildesheim is one of the most famous half-timbered houses in Germany.

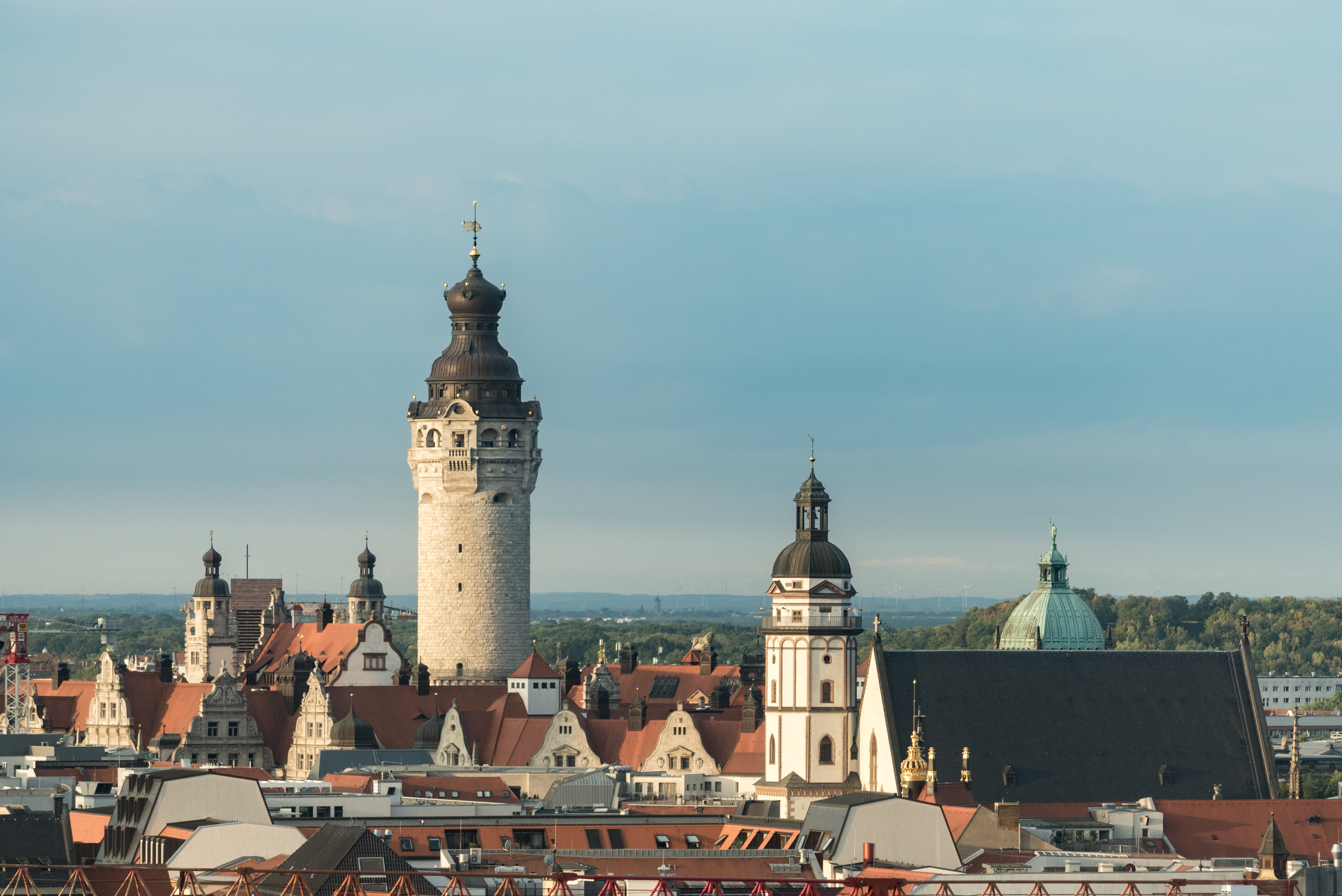
View over Leipzig old town, Germany's Boomtown

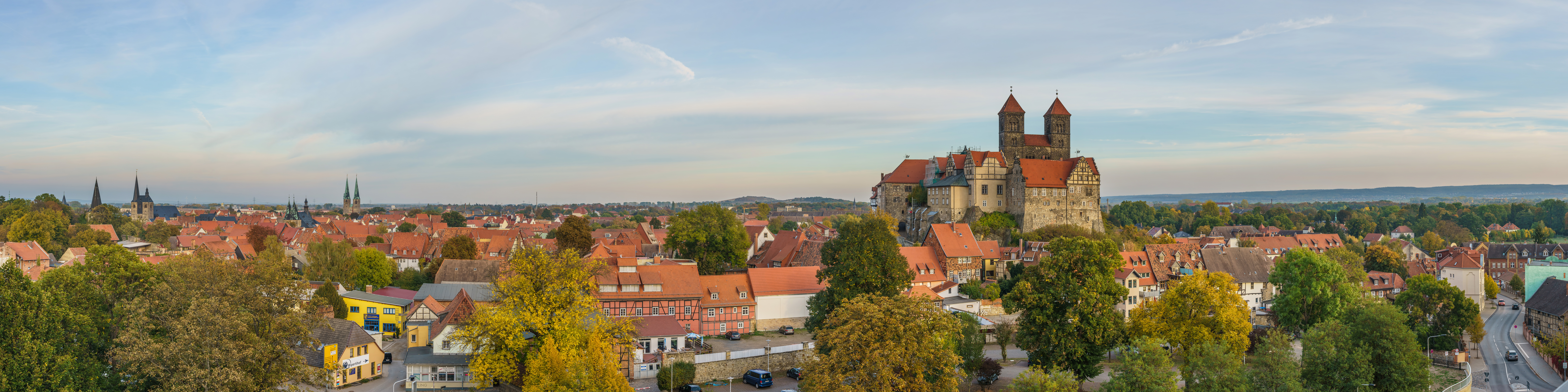
View over Quedlinburg

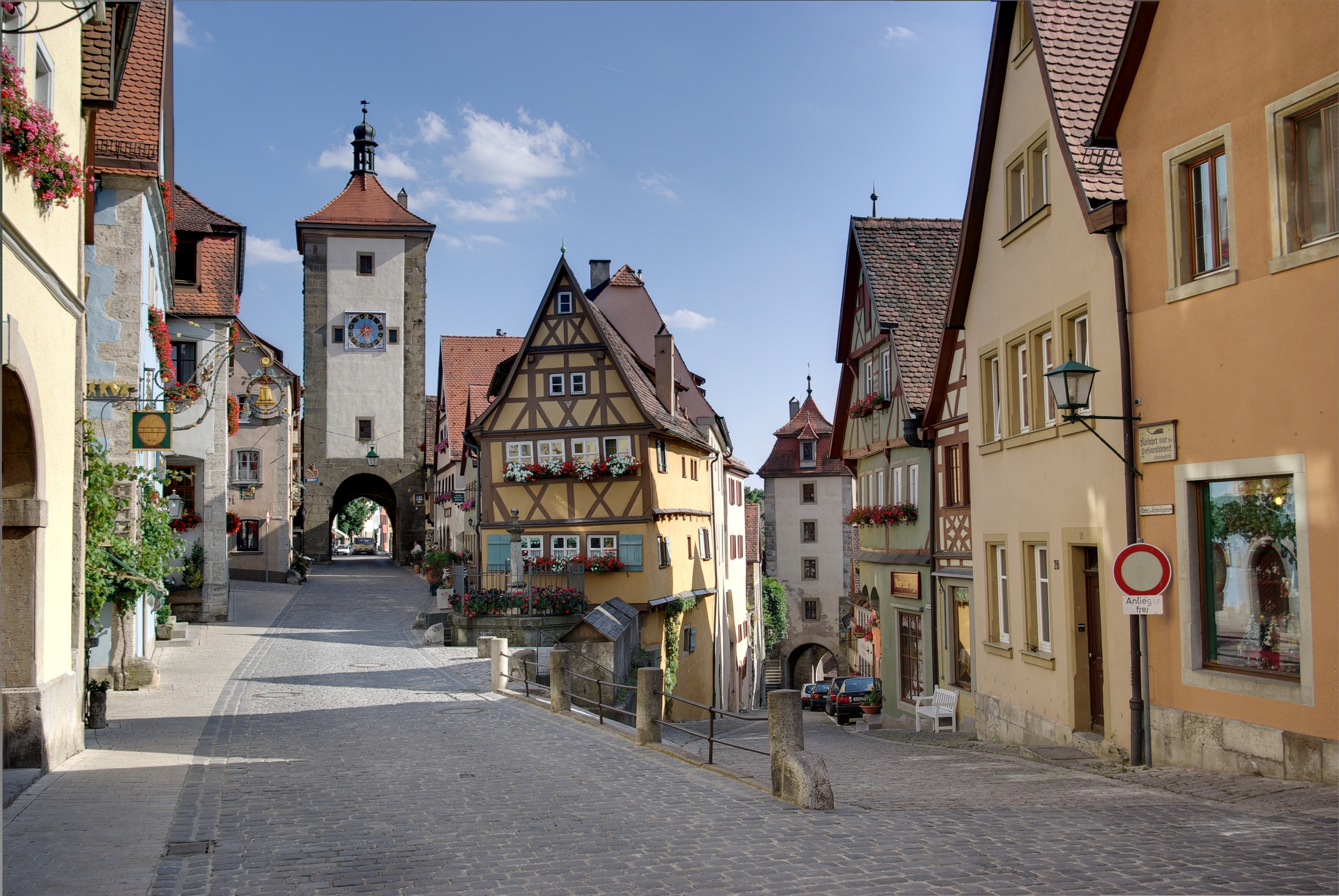
The small town of Rothenburg ob der Tauber is a destination for tourists from around the world.

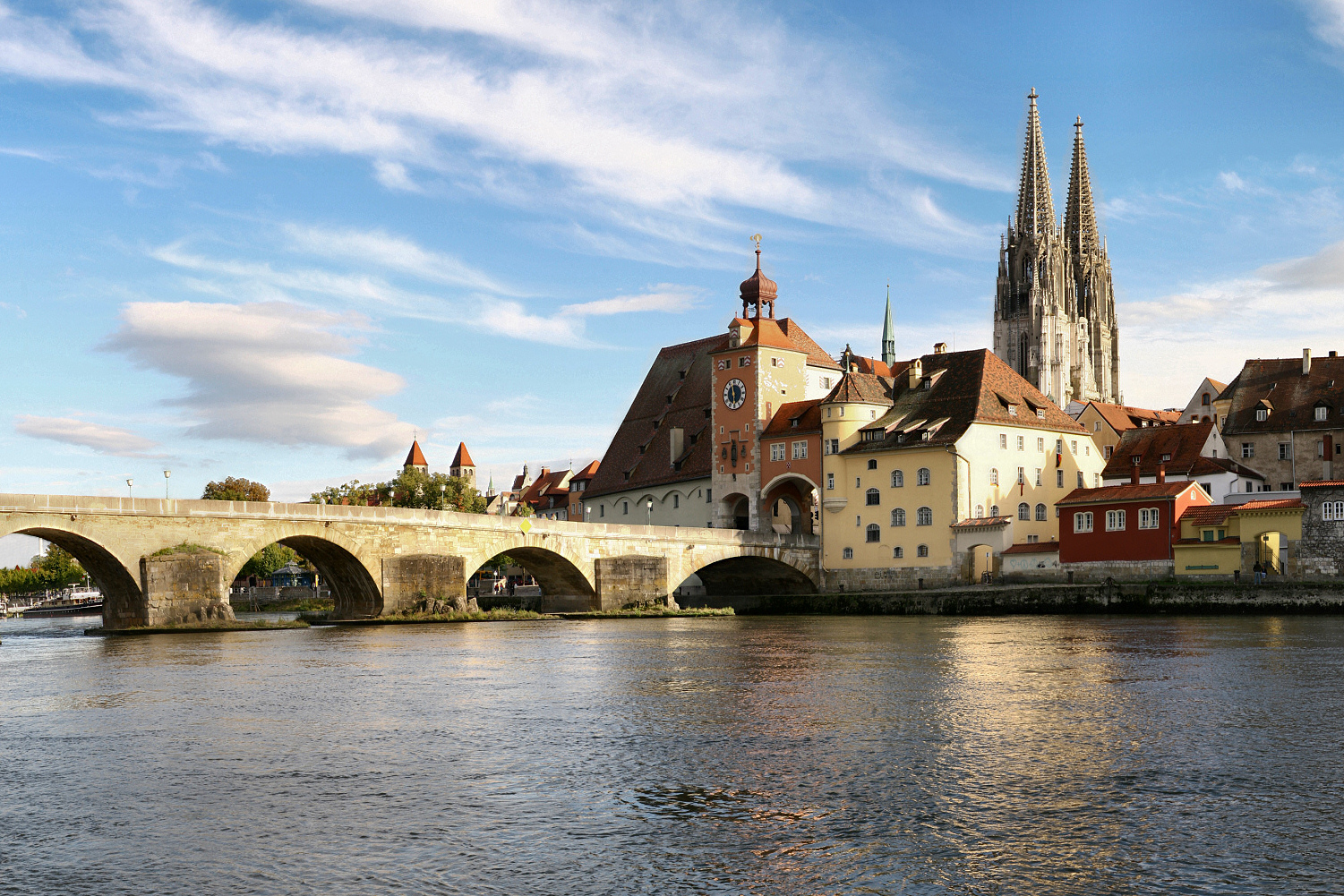
The Stone Bridge and Cathedral St. Peter of Regensburg (UNESCO world heritage)

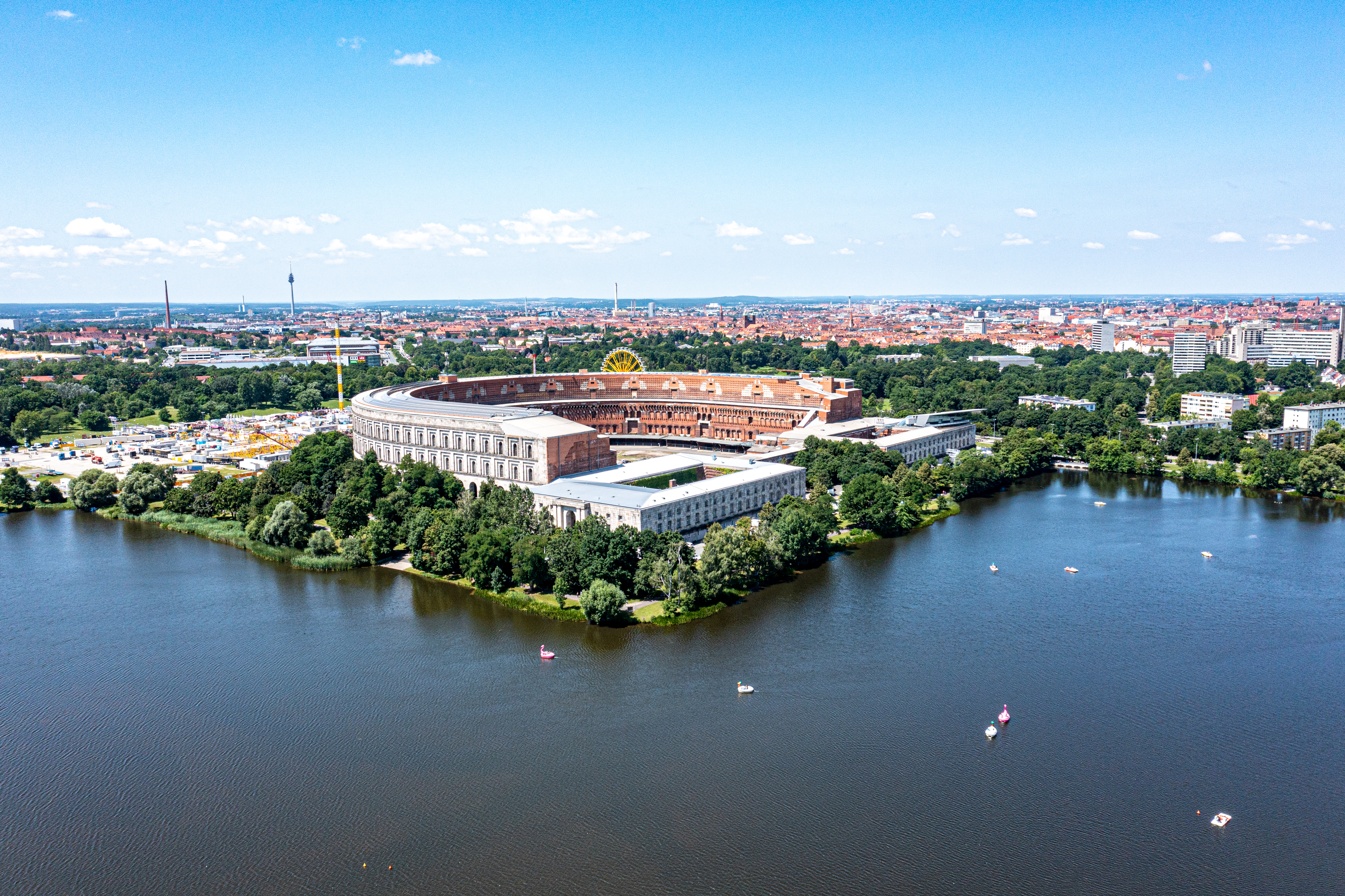
The Kongresshalle (Congress Hall) on the Nazi party rally grounds in Nuremberg

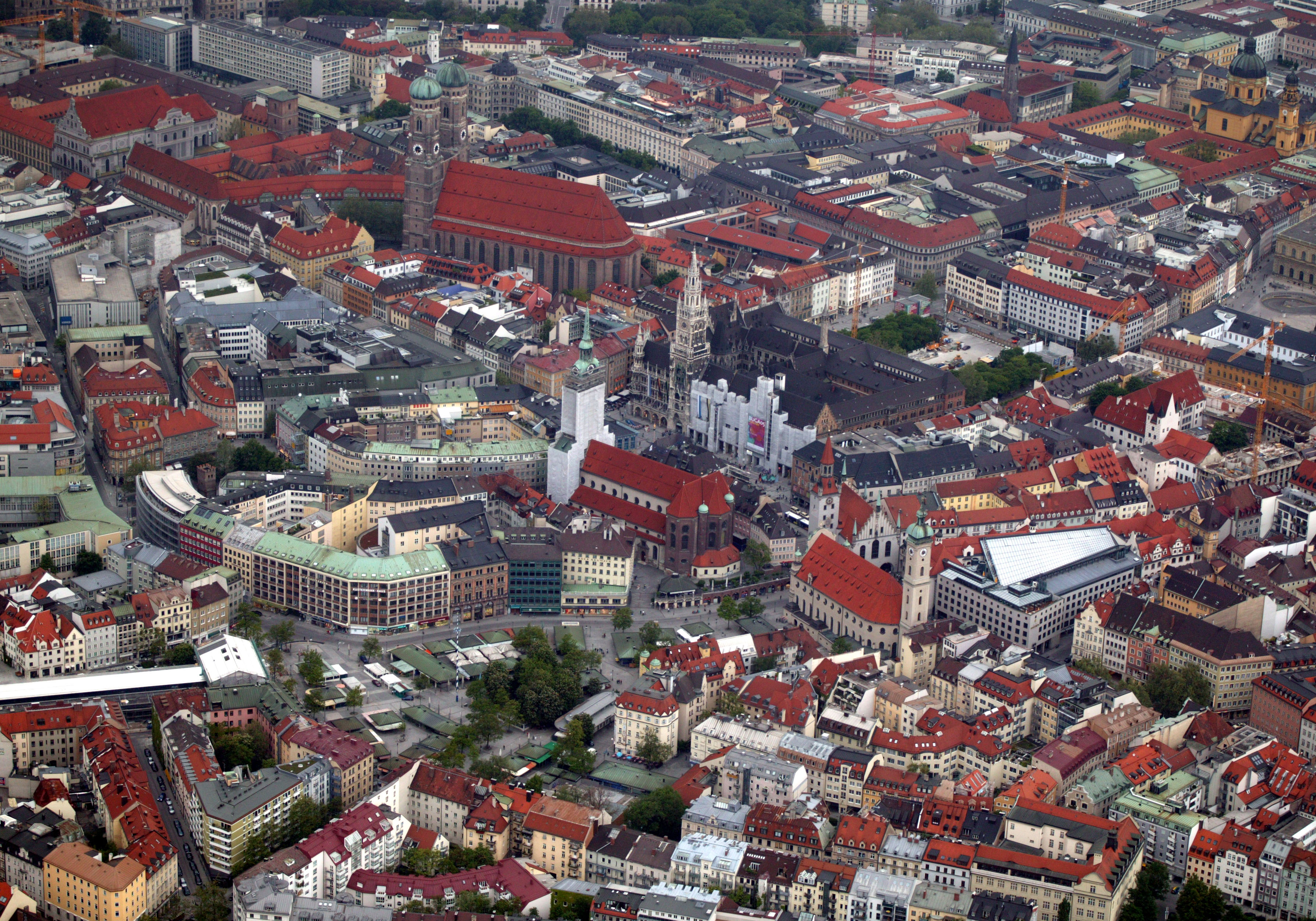
View over Munich's Old Town

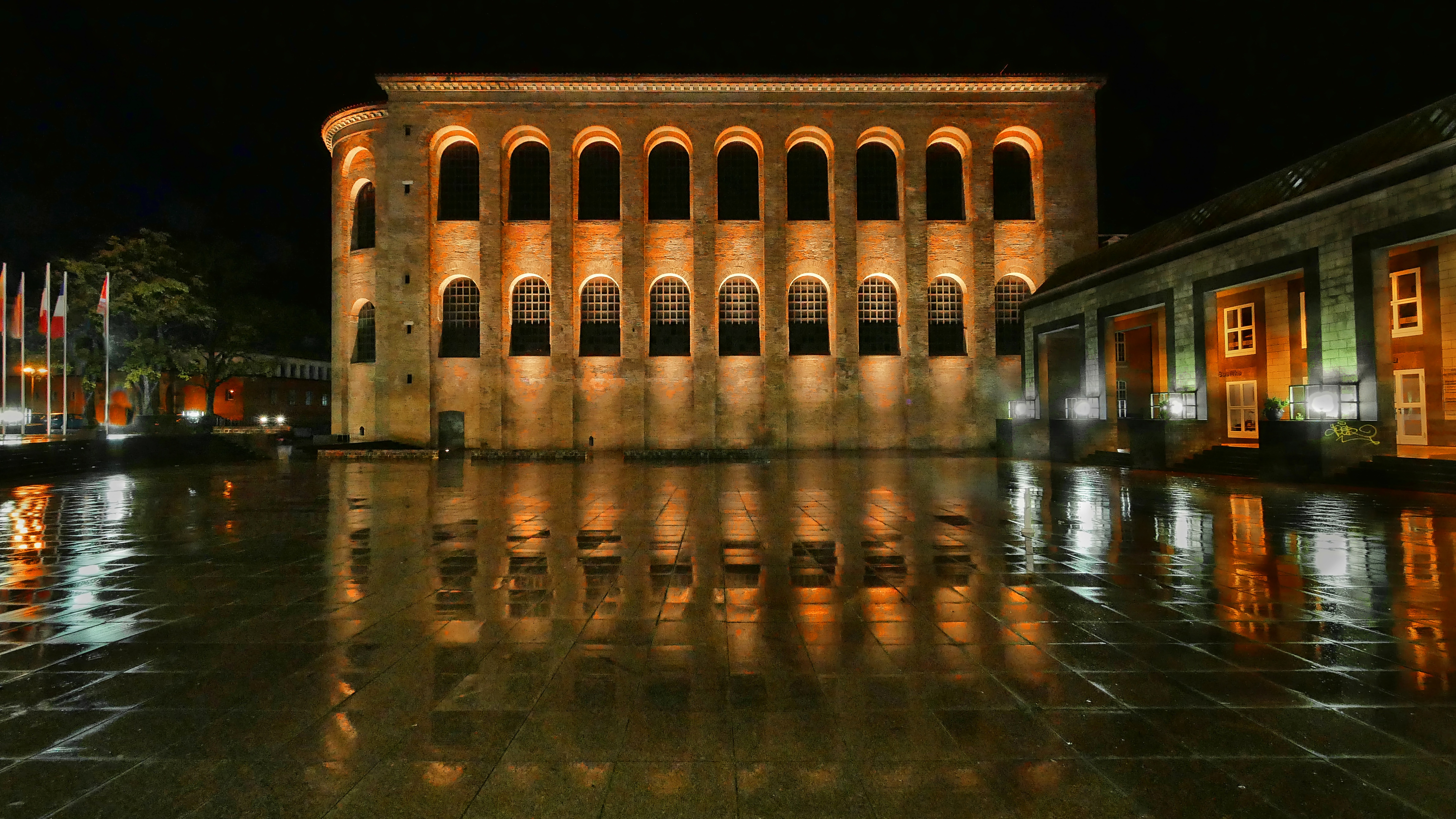
The Aula Palatina of Trier, a basilica constructed during the reign of the Roman emperor Constantine I (r. 306–337 AD)

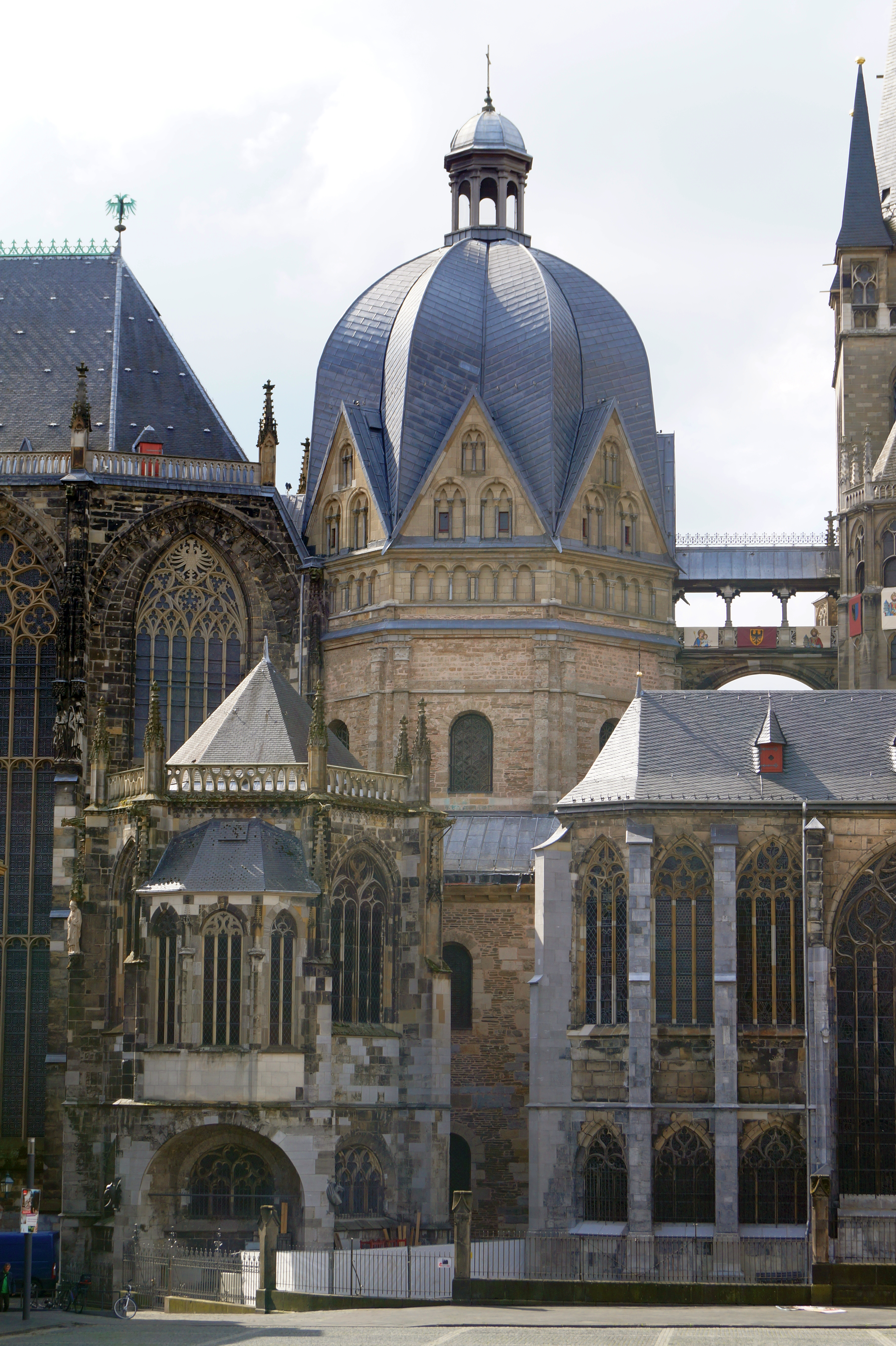
The Palatine Chapel, Aachen, built during the reign of the Carolingian emperor Charlemagne (r. 800-814 AD)

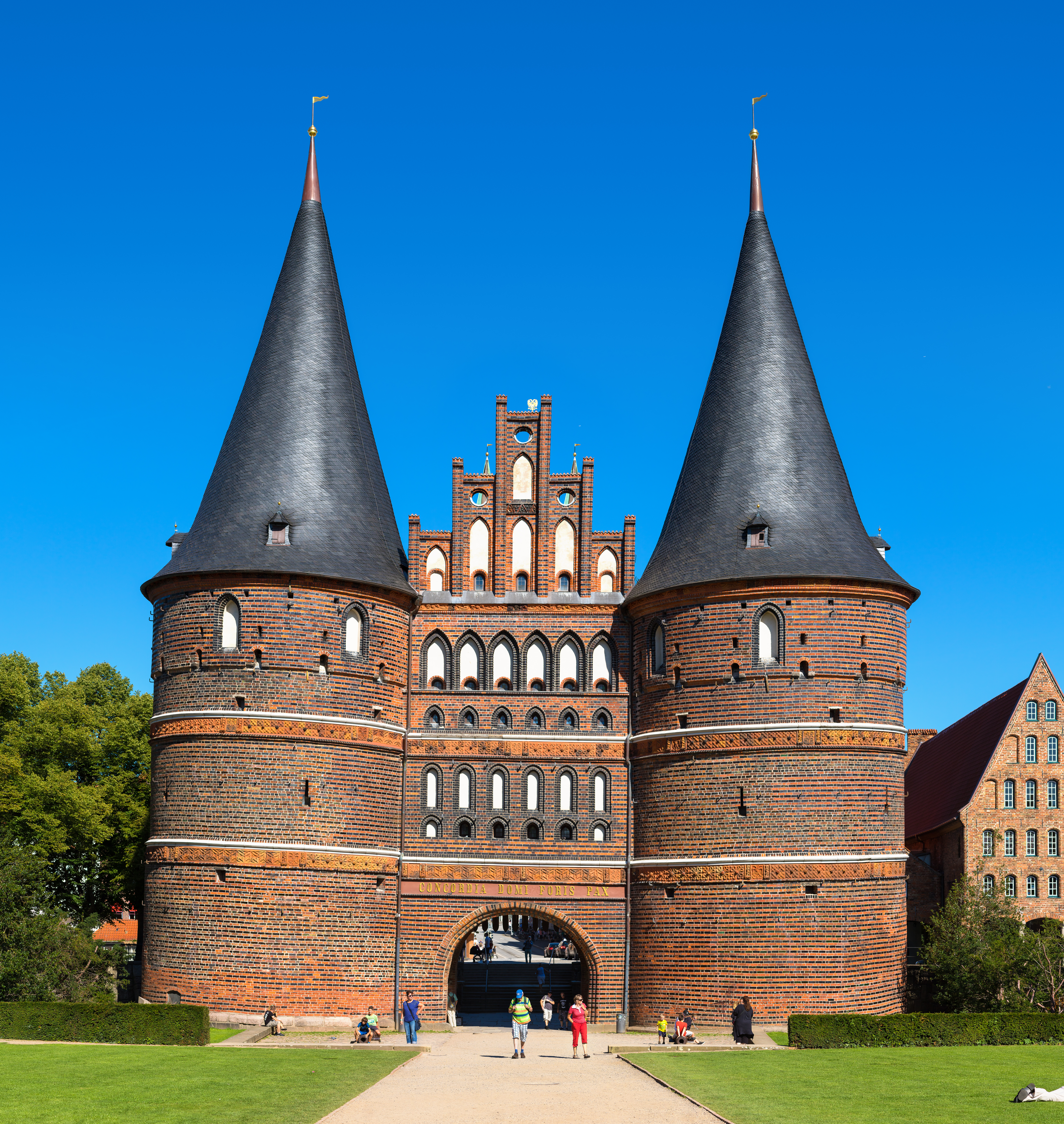
The Holsten Gate in Lübeck, a landmark of the Hanseatic League in Germany

=== Events ===
The table below shows some of the largest annually recurring events in Germany:

Type	Event	Location	Season	# of visitors	Notes
Volksfest	Oktoberfest	Munich	September/October	6.0 million	
Volksfest	Cannstatter Volksfest	Stuttgart	September/October	4.2 million	locally called "Cannstatter Wasen"
Fair	Largest Fair on the Rhine	Düsseldorf	July/August	4.0 million	
Sailing regatta	Kiel Week	Kiel	last week of June (ending the last Sunday in June)	3.5 million	Largest sailing event of the world, one of the largest "Volksfeste" in Germany
Volksfest	Nürnberger Frühlingsfest	Nuremberg	April	2.3 million	locally called "Frühlingsfest"
Volksfest	Nürnberger Herbstfest	Nuremberg	August/September	2.0 million	locally called "Herbstfest"
Volksfest	Libori	Paderborn	End of July	1.7 million	9 days, one of the biggest and oldest city center fests
Techno music festival	Love Parade	varies	June/July	1.6 million	canceled following the Love Parade disaster in 2010
Carnival parade	Cologne Carnival	Cologne	February	1.5 million	number of visitors for Rosenmontagszug
Gay pride	Cologne Pride	Cologne	June/July	1.2 million	
Maritime festival	Hanse Sail	Rostock	2nd weekend of August	1.1 million	one of Europe's biggest events for sailors
Rock music festival	Bochum Total	Bochum	June/July/August	1.0 million	
Anniversary	Port of Hamburg birthday	Hamburg	7 May	1.0 million	
Fireworks show	Kölner Lichter	Cologne	July	1.0 million	
contemporary art exhibition	documenta Kassel	Kassel		0.9 million	only held once every 5 years
Rock music festival	Rock am Ring and Rock im Park	Nürburgring & Nuremberg	May/June	0.8 million	
Wine festival	Wurstmarkt	Bad Dürkheim	2nd—3rd weekend in September	0.6 million	
Film festival	Berlinale (Berlin International Film Festival)	Berlin	February	0.5 million	Film festival
Rhine river fireworks	Rhein in Flammen	Bonn	May	0.5 million	
Classical music	Schleswig-Holstein Musik Festival	throughout Schleswig-Holstein	July/August	0.2 million	
World Marathon Major	Berlin Marathon	Berlin	September		
contemporary art exhibition	Quadriennale Düsseldorf	Düsseldorf	September/January		only held once every 4 years

Note: This list only includes the largest, annually recurring events in selected categories. This list may be incomplete.

=== Trade fairs ===
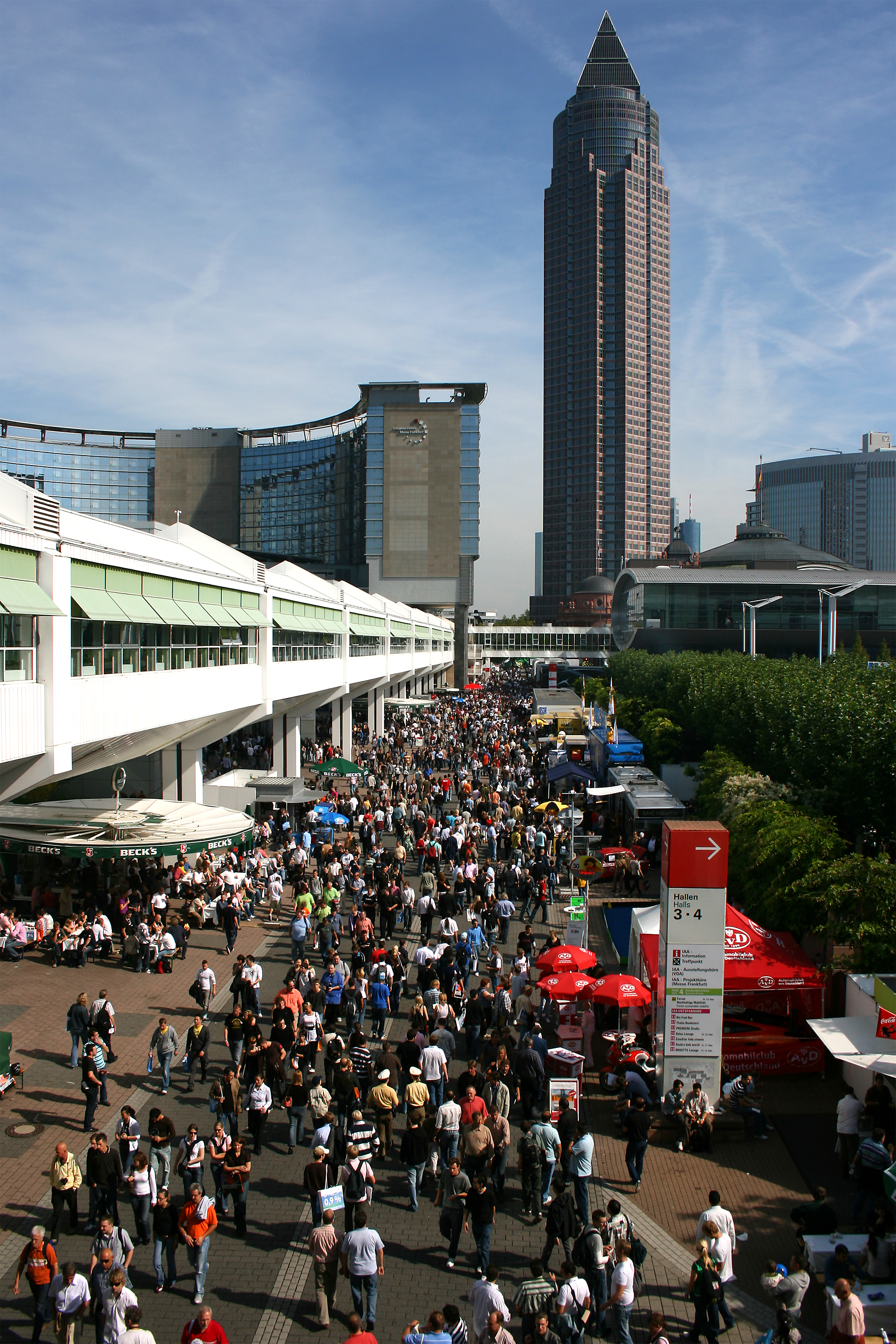
Visitors at IAA 2007

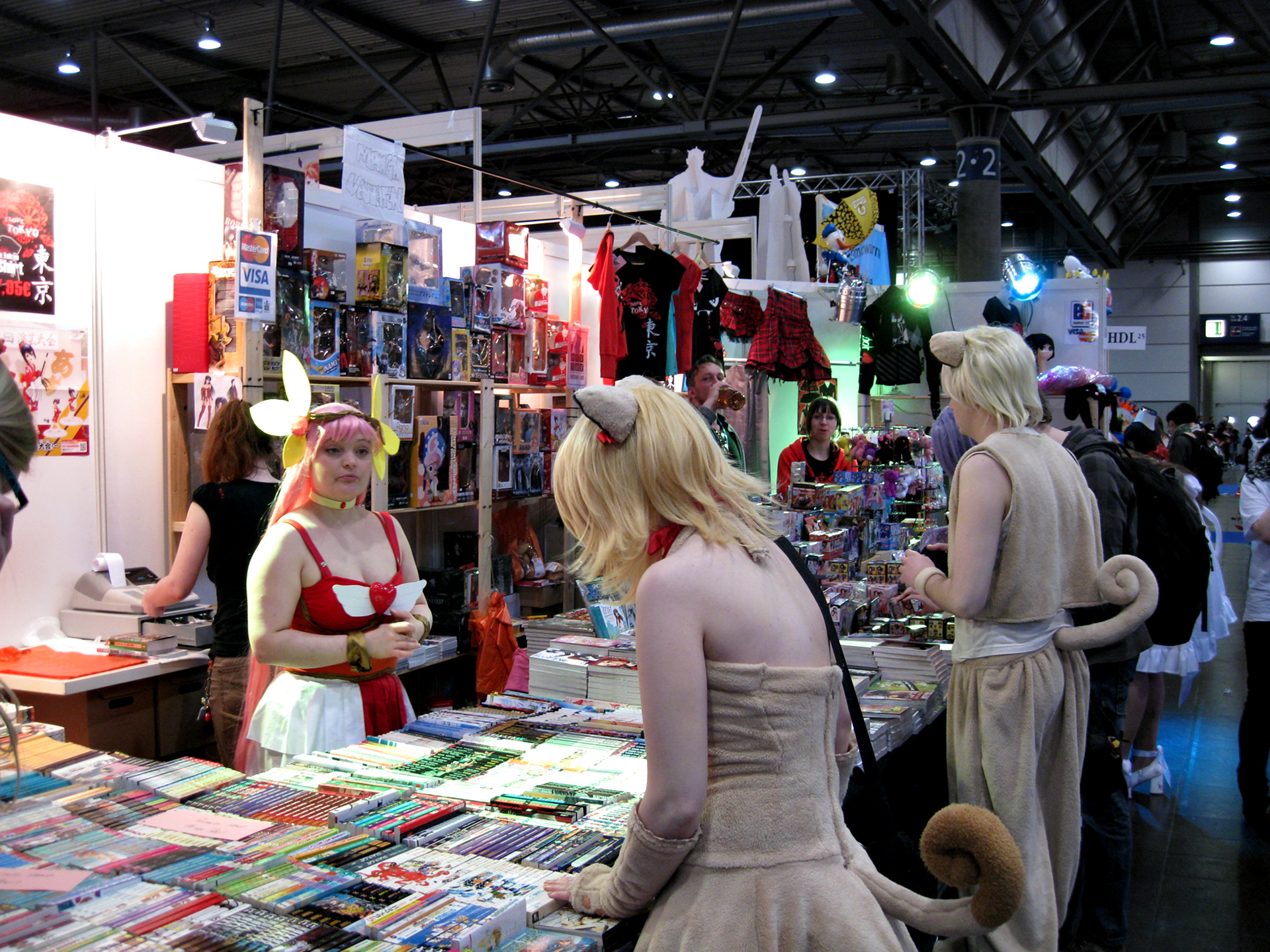
The Leipzig Book Fair in 2012

Germany is home to several of the world's largest trade fairgrounds, and many of the international exhibitions are considered trend-setters or industry leaders. Thousands of national and international trade fairs, conventions and congresses are held in Germany annually. In 2008, 10.3 million people visited the 150 largest trade fairs alone. More than half of these visitors come from abroad, more than one third from countries outside Europe. The table below shows some of the most visited trade fairs.

Trade fair ground	City	Trade fair	Industry	# of visitors	Notes
Messe Frankfurt	Frankfurt, Main	Internationale Automobilausstellung (IAA)	motor show	850,000 in 2009	held in Hanover every other year as a truck show
	Frankfurt, Main	Frankfurt Book Fair	books	300,000 in 2008	
		ISH	heating, ventilation and air conditioning	201,000 in 2009	biennial
Messegelände	Hanover	CeBIT	computer expo	334,000	87,000 foreign visitors
	Hanover	Hannover Messe	industrial technology	250,000 in 2011	world's biggest industrial fair
Messe München	Munich	BAUMA	construction machinery	530,000 in 2013	triennial
	Munich	BAU	architecture, materials, systems engineering	212,000 in 2009	biennial
Messe Nürnberg	Nuremberg	Consumenta	consumer goods	214,209 in 2003	biennial
	Nuremberg	Holz-Handwerk	machine technology, equipment and supplies for woodworking	193,169 in 2001	biennial
Messe Berlin	Berlin	International Green Week (IGW)	sustainable agriculture	425,000	9,000 foreign visitors
	Berlin	Internationale Funkausstellung (IFA)	consumer electronics	240,000 in 2012	
Messe Düsseldorf	Düsseldorf	Drupa	print media	390,000	230,000 foreign visitors, quadrennial
	Düsseldorf	Boot Düsseldorf	boats	267.000	43,000 foreign visitors
	Düsseldorf	Kunststoffmesse (K)	plastics	242,000 in 2007	triennial
Koelnmesse	Cologne	Gamescom	video games	345,000 in 2015	organised by Leipzig Trade Fair until 2008 as Games Convention

Note: This list only includes trade fairs with 250,000 visitors per year or more. This list may be incomplete.

== Most visited ==
=== Protected areas ===
The table below shows the most visited protected areas in Germany.

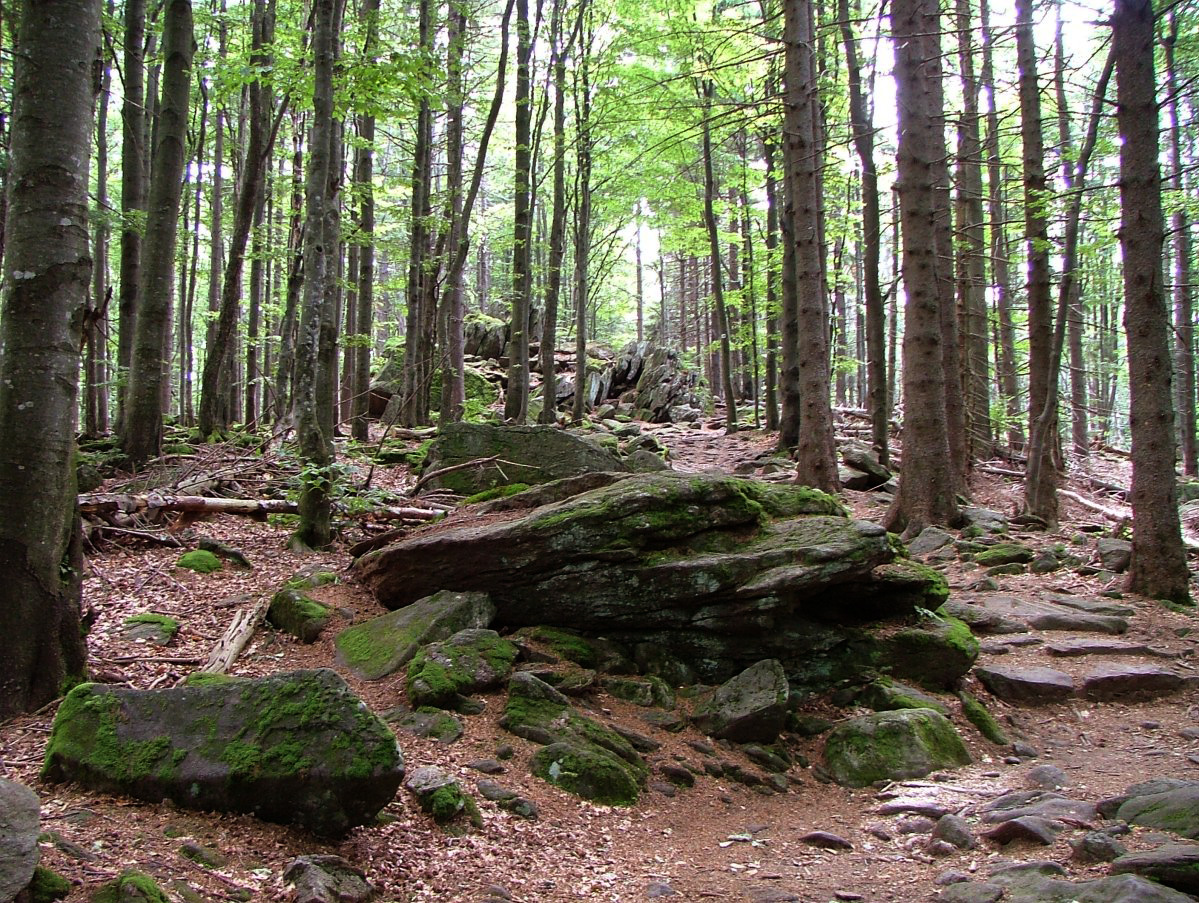
Bavarian Forest National Park

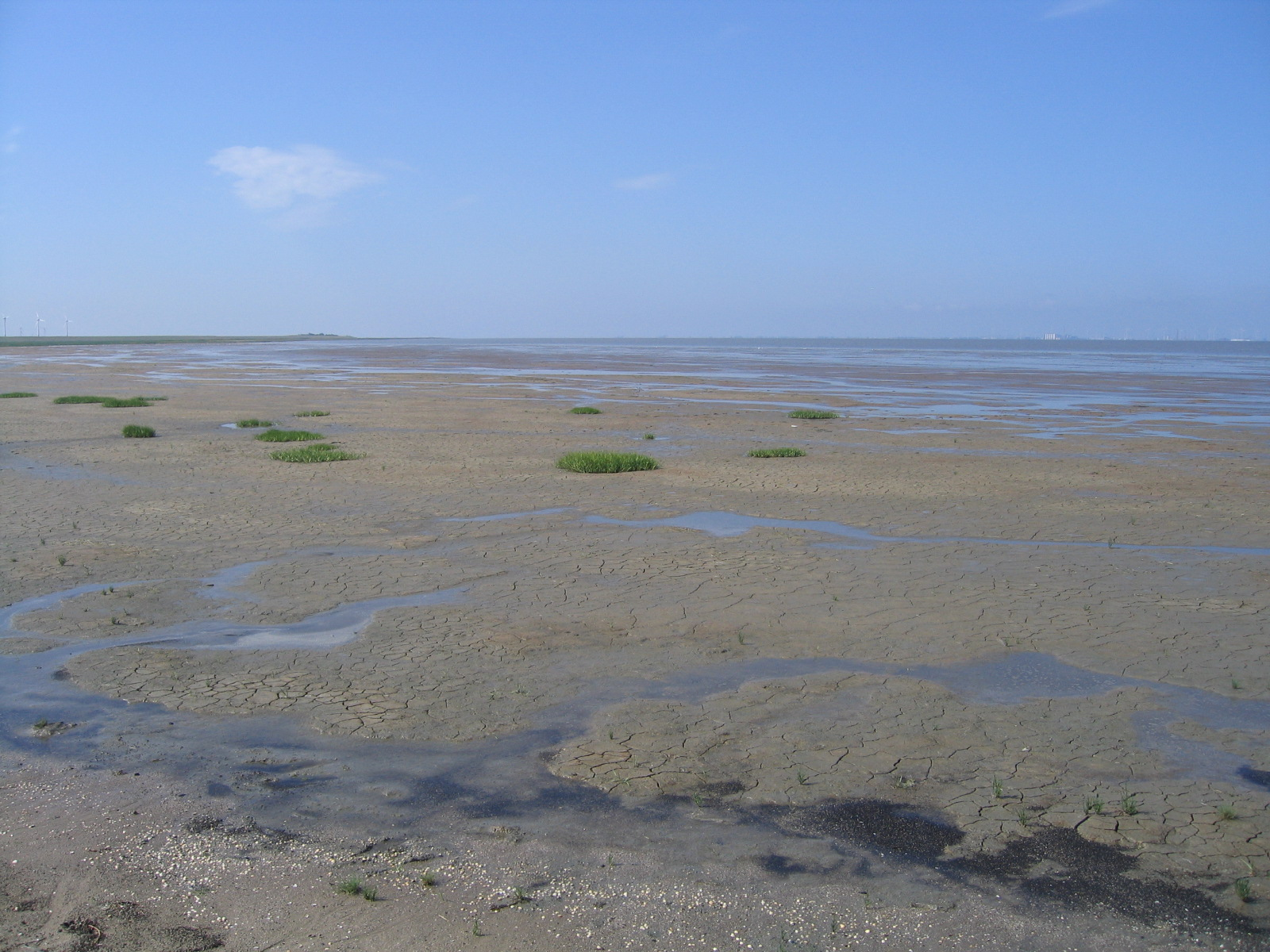
Lower Saxon Wadden Sea National Park

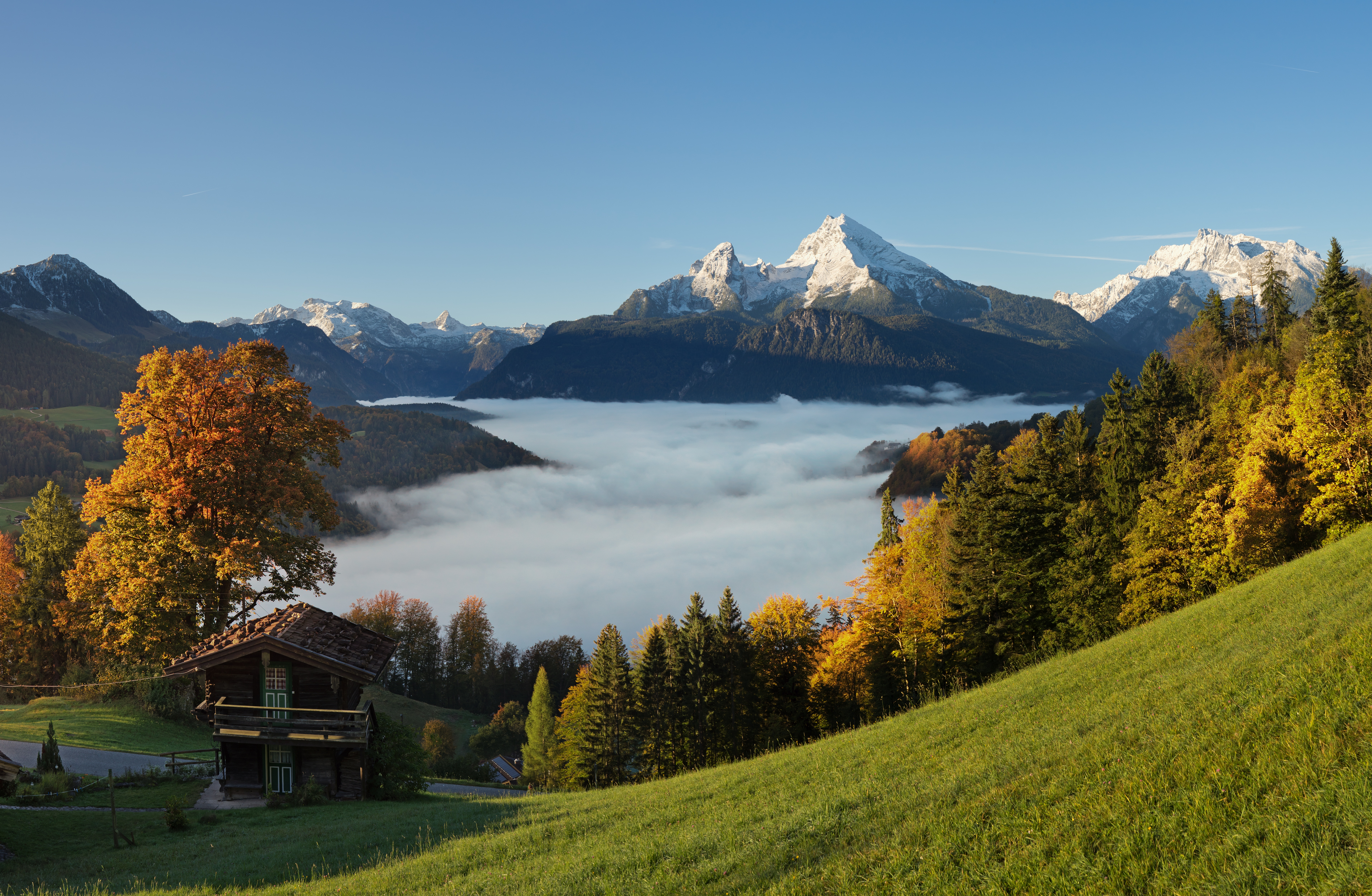
Berchtesgaden National Park

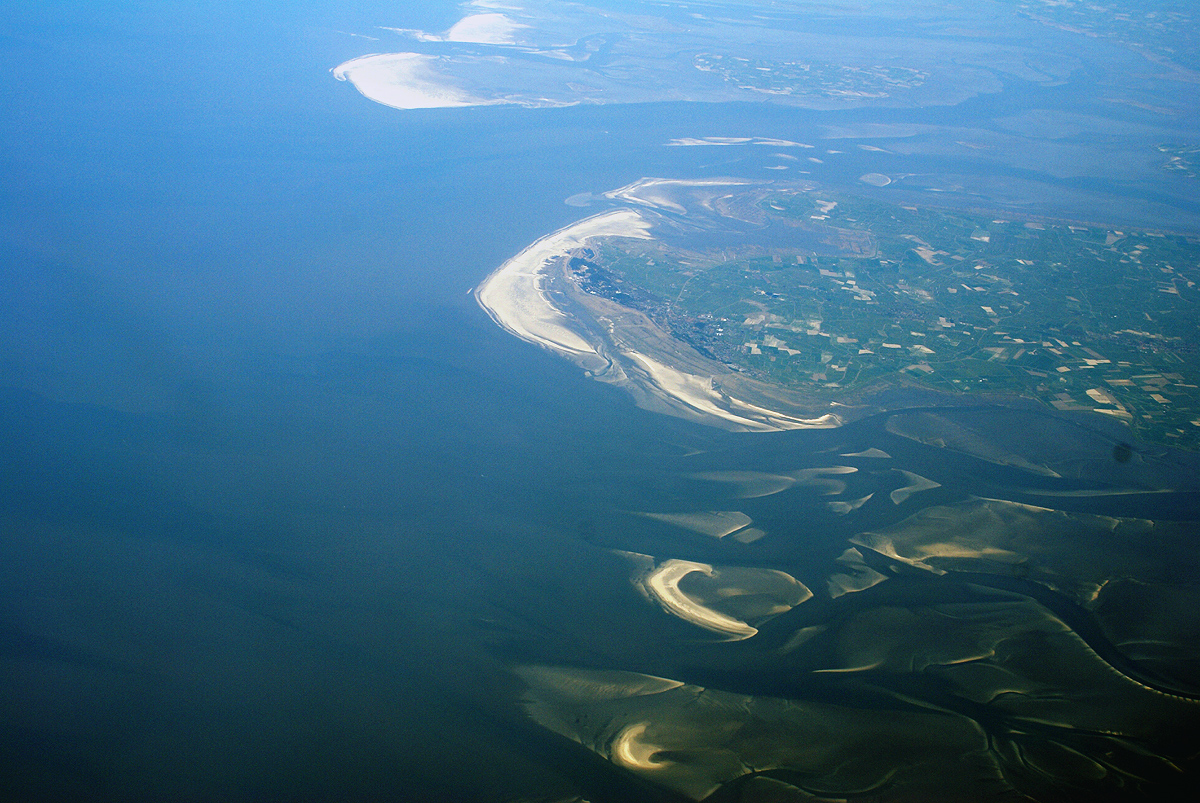
Schleswig-Holstein Wadden Sea National Park

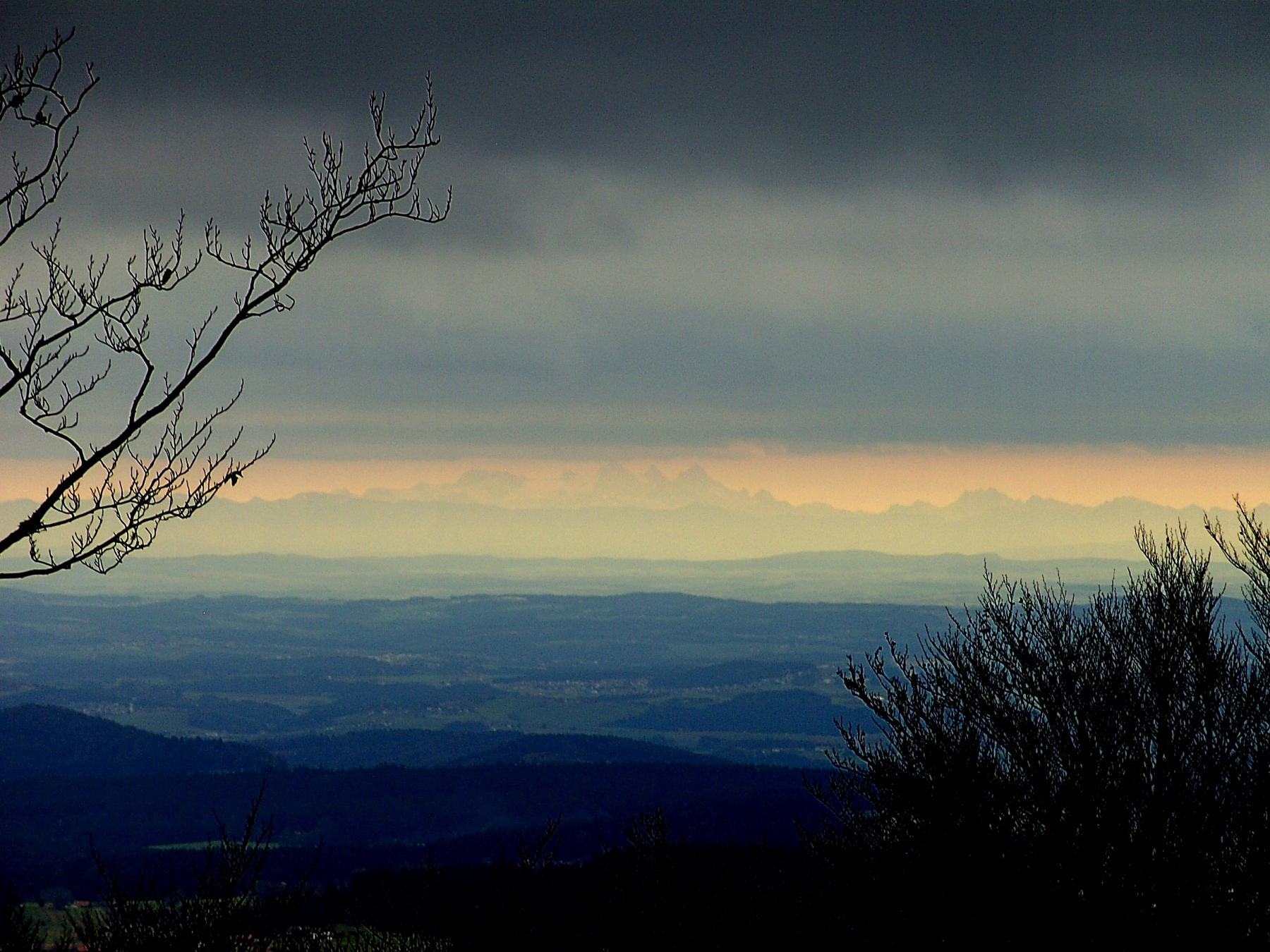
View from Mt. Lusen in the Bavarian Forest over the Alpine Foreland

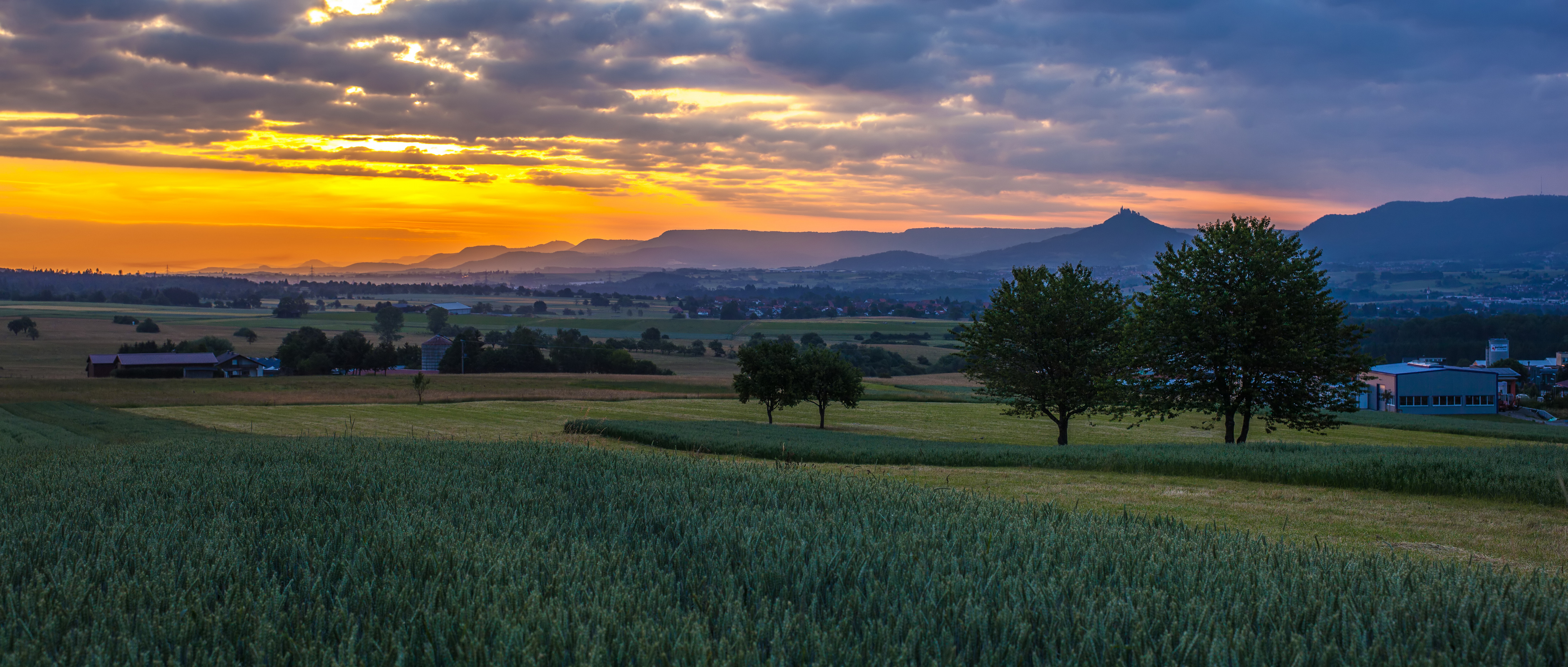
Swabian Jura

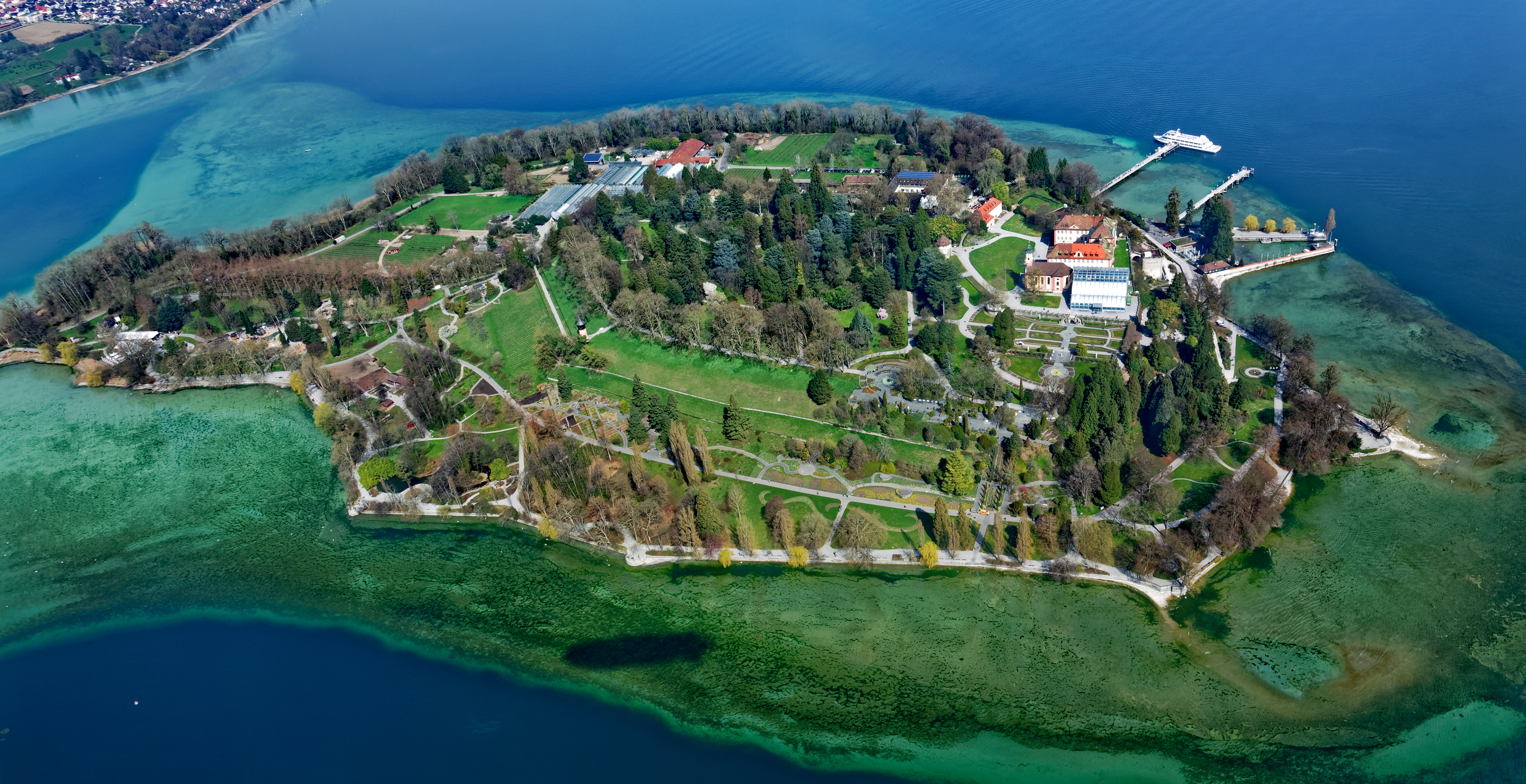
Mainau

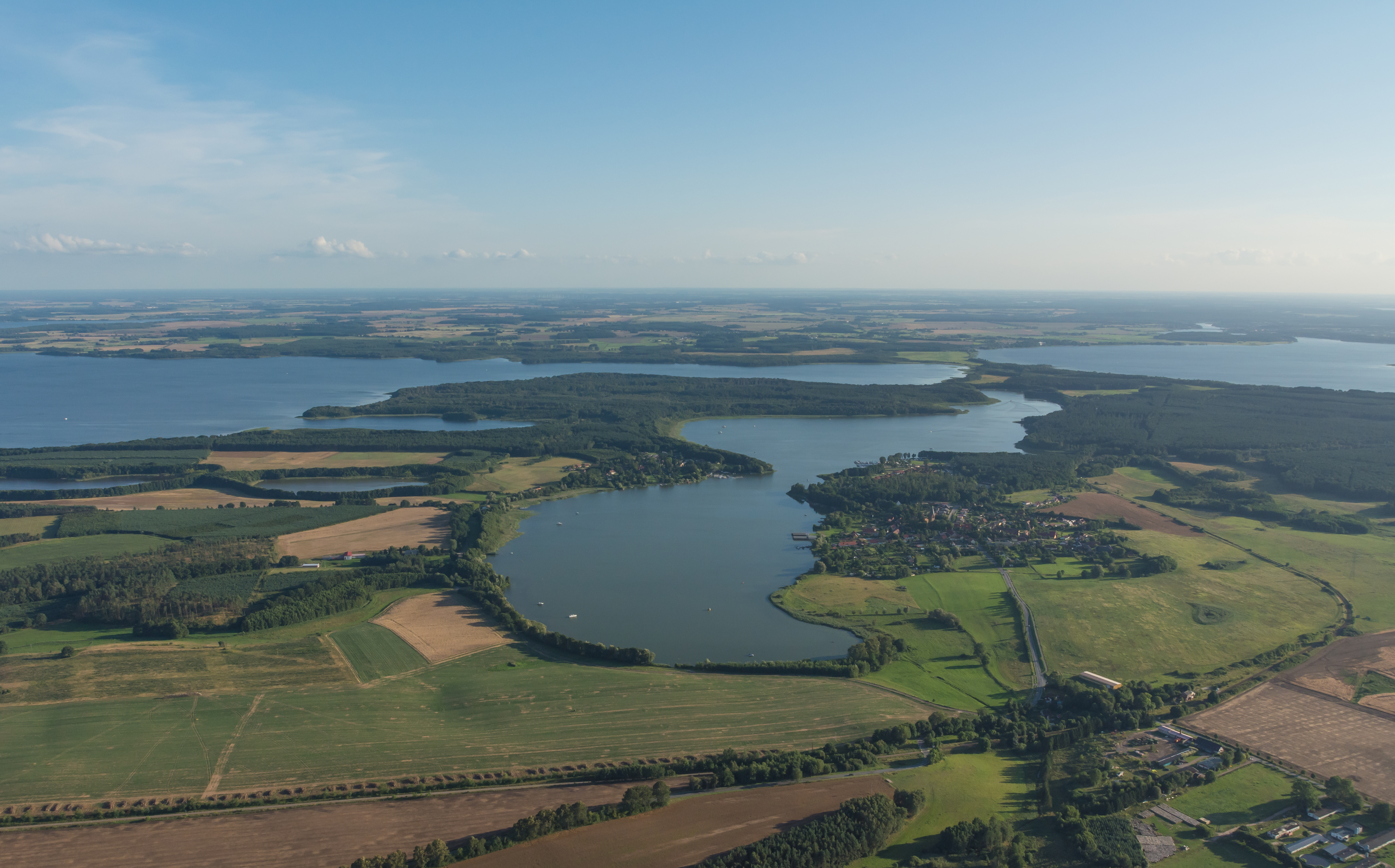
The Kölpinsee, Jabelscher See and Fleesensee in the Mecklenburg Lake Plateau

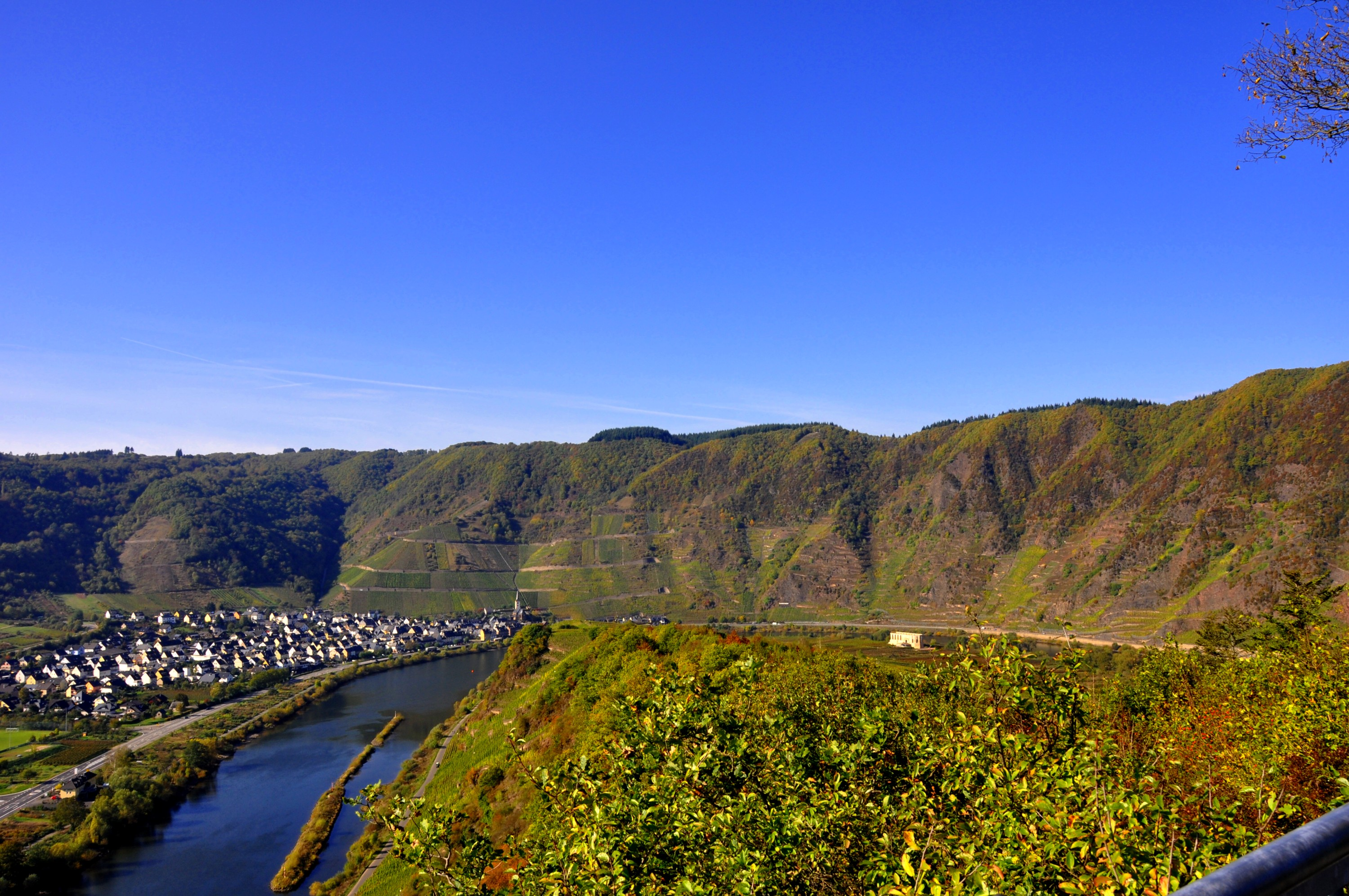
View over the Moselle and past the village of Dorf Bremm to the Calmont in the Eifel

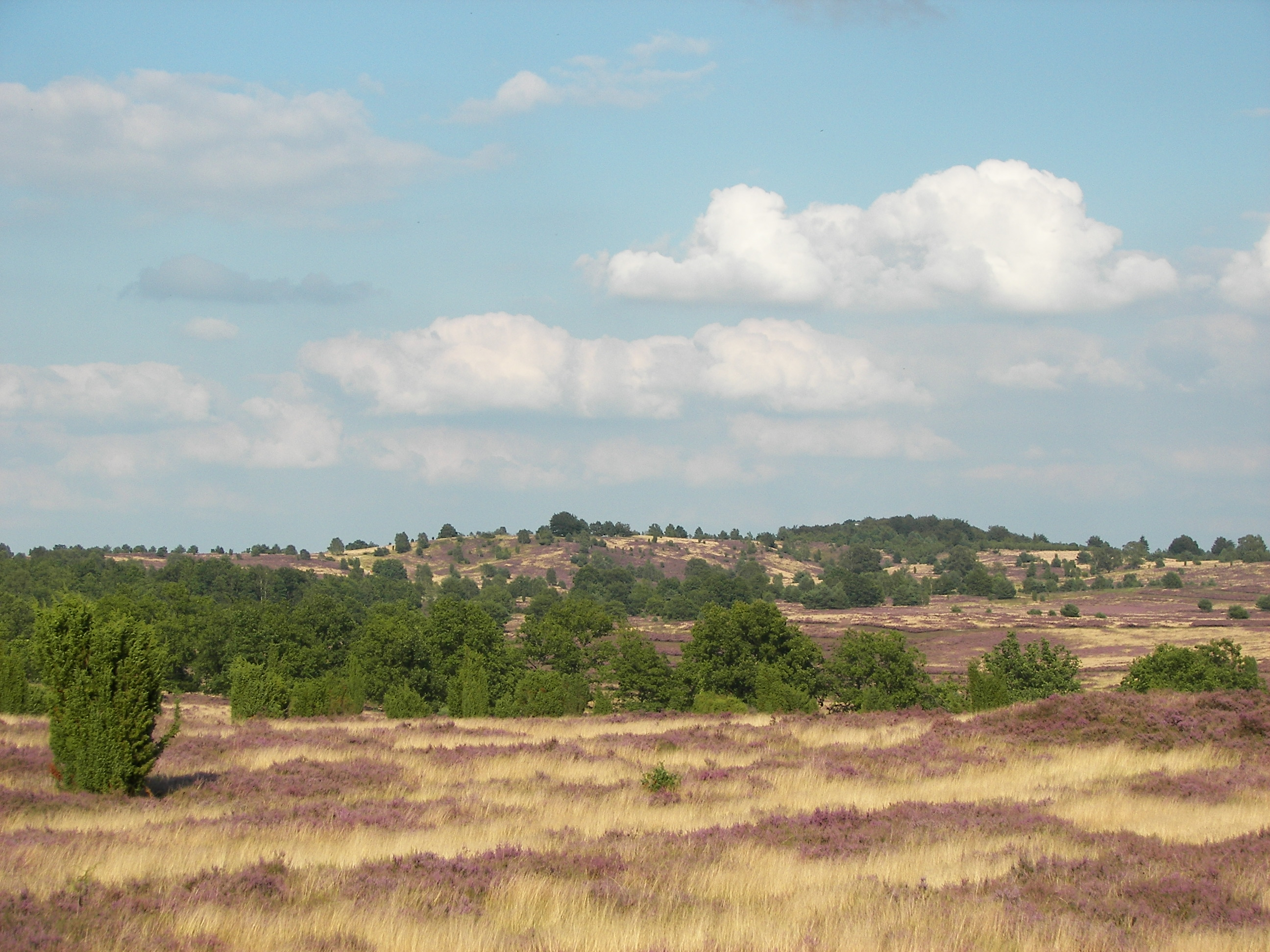
Wilseder Berg in the Lüneburg Heath

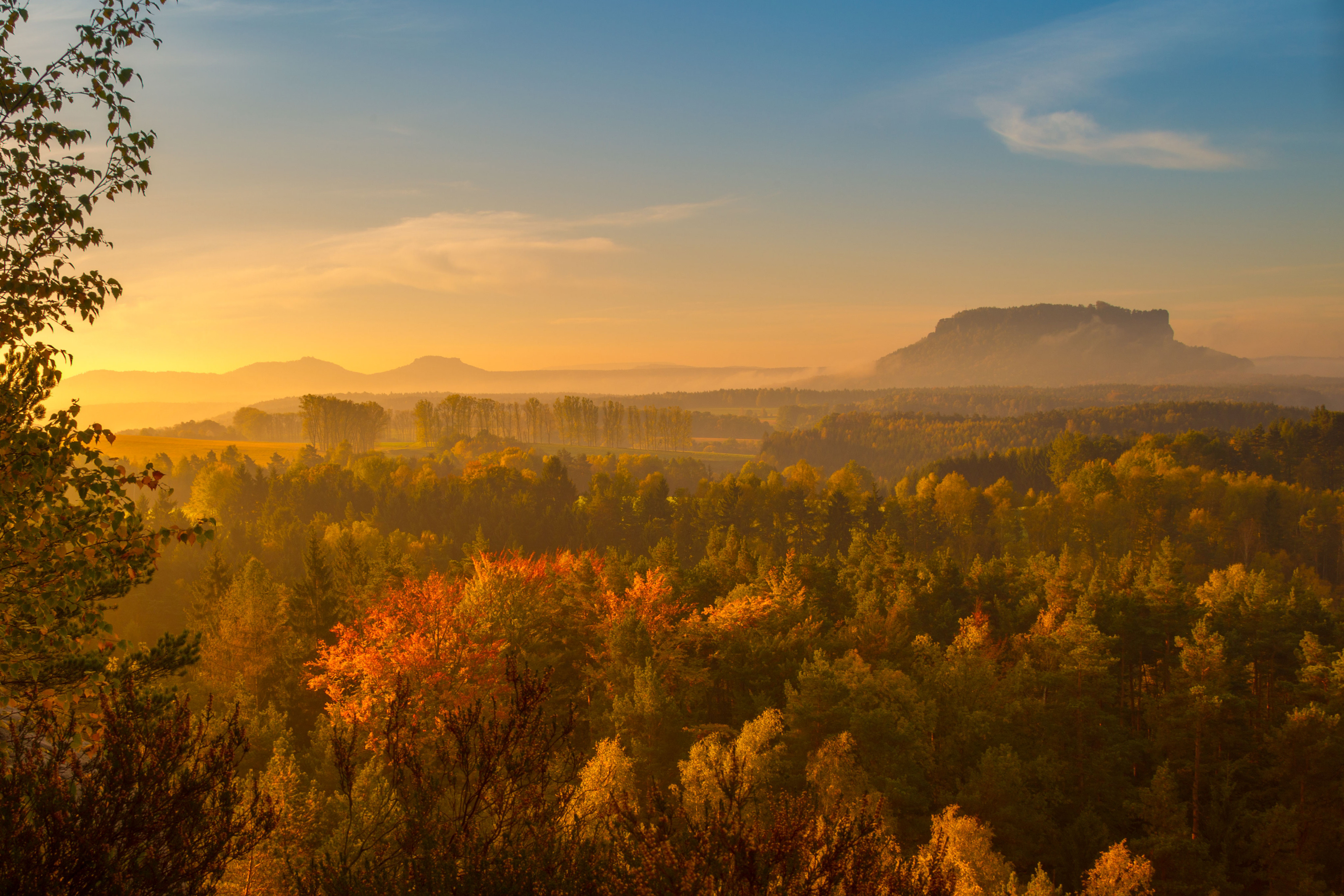
Lilienstein at Saxon Switzerland

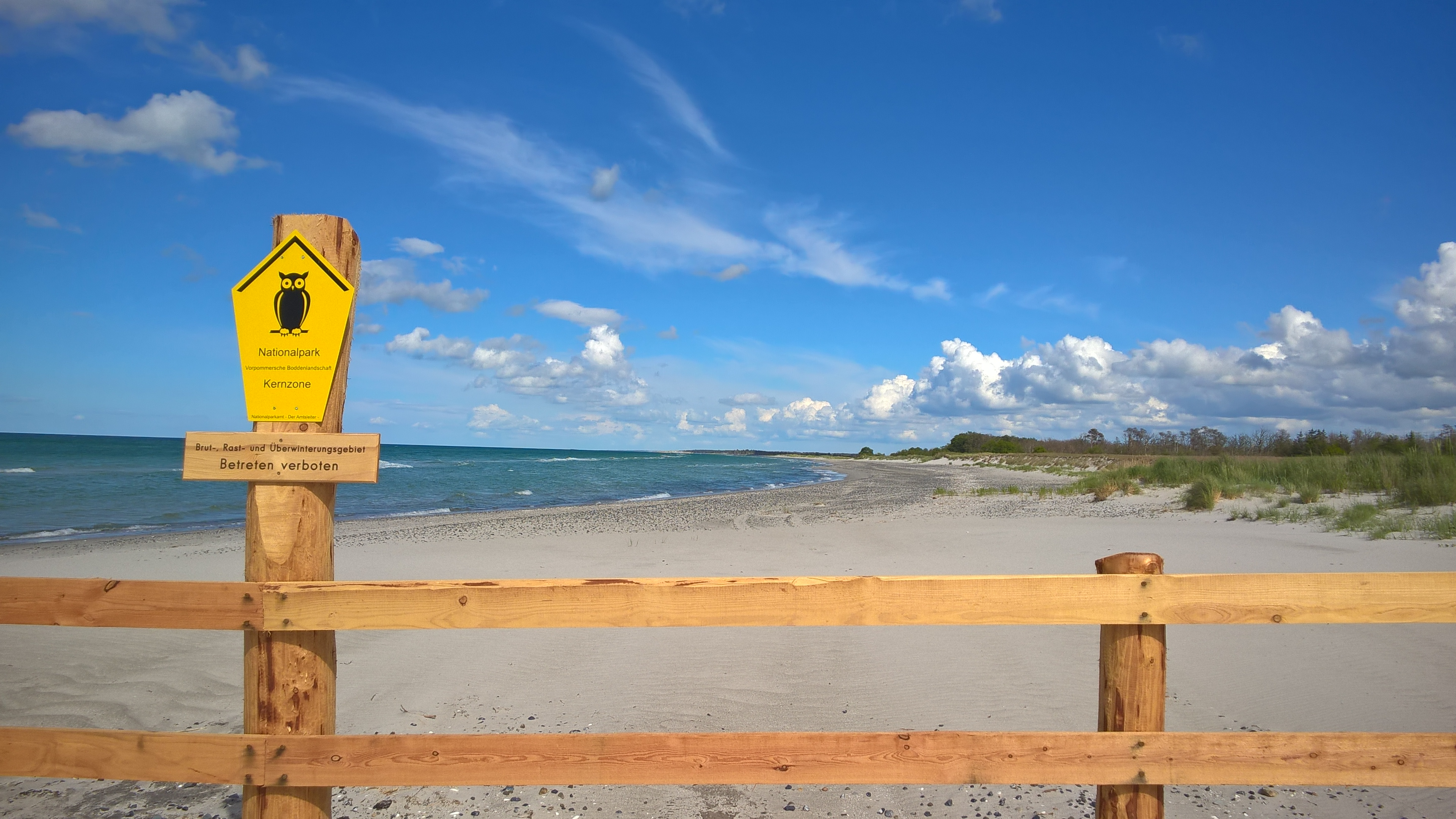
The Western Pomerania Lagoon Area National Park

Rank	Protected area	Location	Type	# of visitors in 2002	# of visitors in 2008
1	Western Pomerania Lagoon Area National Park	Mecklenburg-Vorpommern	National park	2.50 million	3.00 million
2	Saxon Switzerland National Park	Saxony	National park	2.15 million	2.90 million
3	Bavarian Forest National Park	Bavaria	National park	2.00 million	
4	Jasmund National Park	Mecklenburg-Vorpommern	National park	2.00 million	
5	Lower Saxony Wadden Sea National Park ^{1}	Lower Saxony	National park	2.00 million	
6	Berchtesgaden National Park	Bavaria	National park	1.50 million	
7	Harz National Park	Lower Saxony, Saxony-Anhalt	National park	1.50 million	
8	Schleswig-Holstein Wadden Sea National Park^{1}	Schleswig-Holstein	National park	1.50 million	
9	Mainau Island	Baden-Württemberg	garden island	1.30 million	

Note: This list only includes protected areas with 1 million or more visitors per year. This list may be incomplete.

^{1} World Heritage Site in Germany

=== Landmarks ===
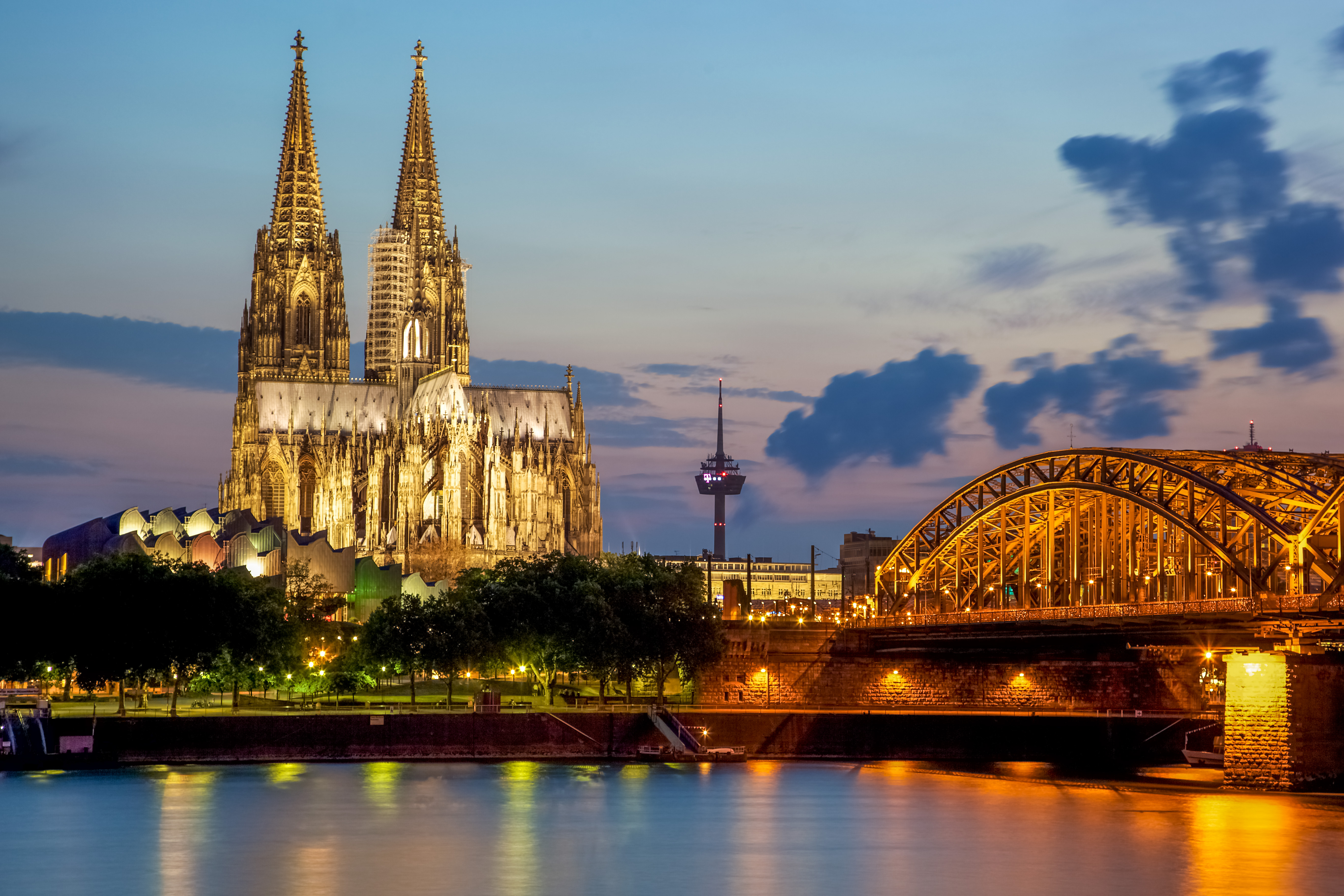
The Cathedral of Cologne is Germany's most visited landmark.

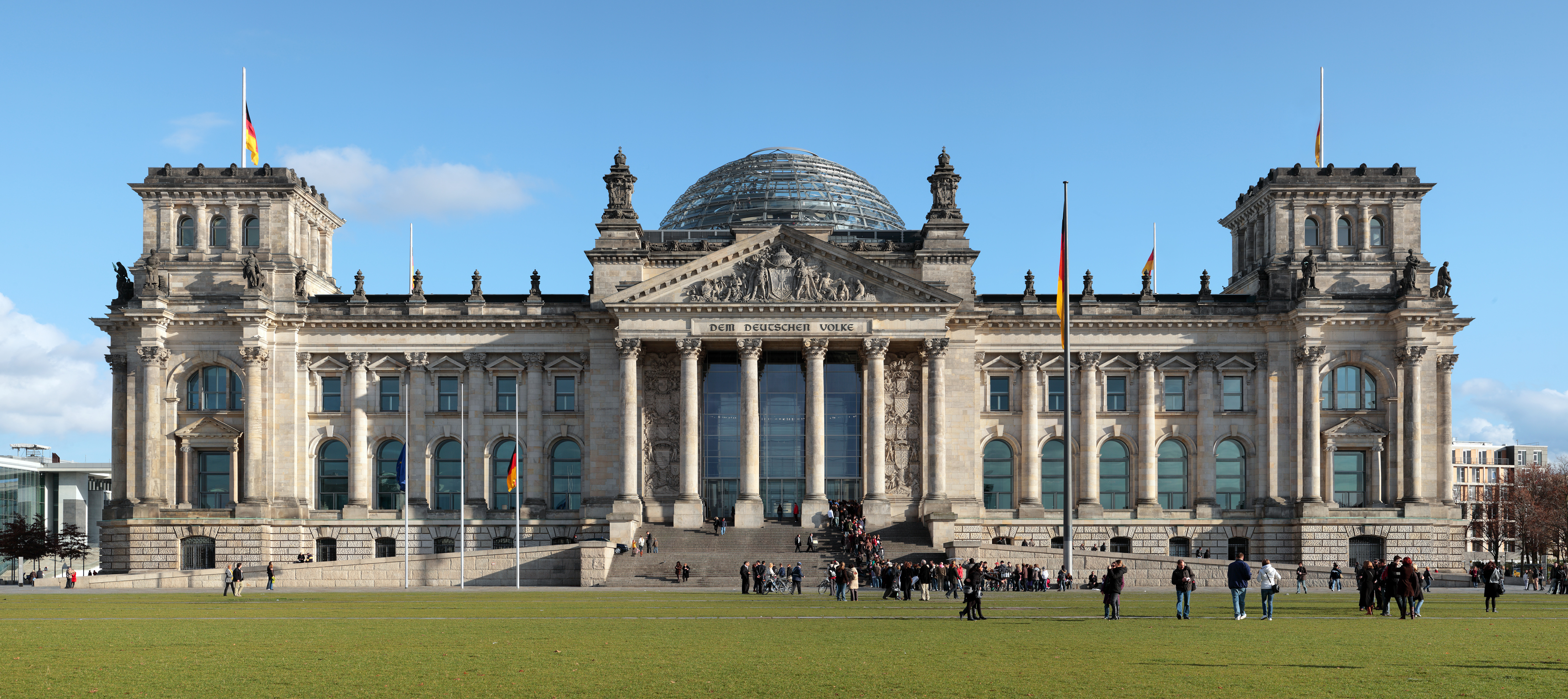
Reichstag building in Berlin

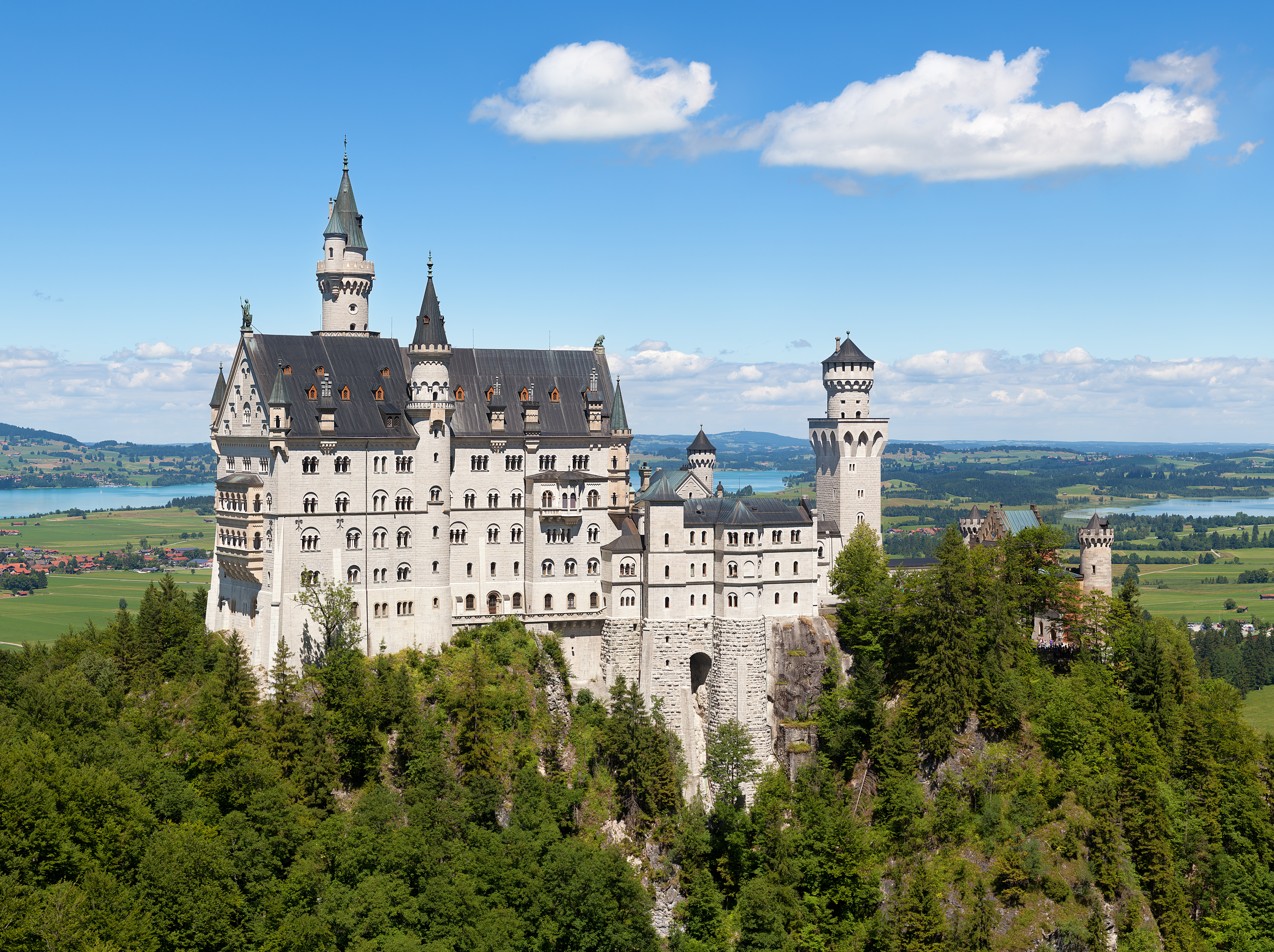
Neuschwanstein Castle was the inspiration for Disneyland's Sleeping Beauty's Castle.

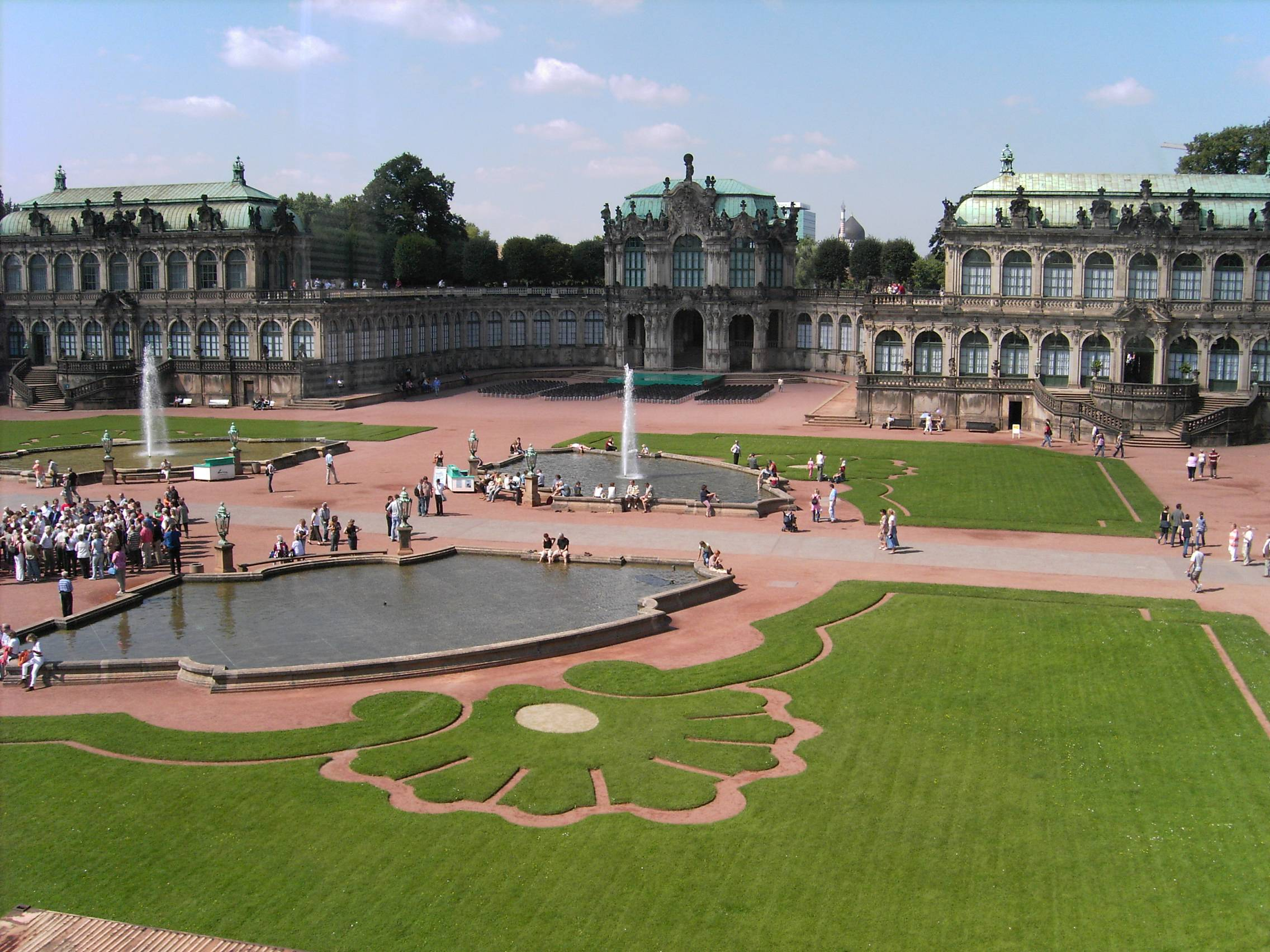
The Zwinger in Dresden

The German Tourism Association (Deutscher Tourismusverband) irregularly publishes statistics on the most visited landmarks. With an average of over 6 million visitors entering Cologne Cathedral per year, the cathedral is Germany's most visited landmark. Second and third places go to the Reichstag building in Berlin and the Hofbräuhaus in Munich. Other much visited architectural landmarks include the Drosselgasse in Rüdesheim (3.0m), the medieval old towns of Rothenburg ob der Tauber (2.5m), Regensburg (2.0m), Frauenkirche in Dresden (2.5m), Bad Münstereifel (2m), the Brandenburg Gate in Berlin and the Holsten Gate in Lübeck ^{1}.

Rank	Landmark	Location	Subject	# of visitors
1	Cologne Cathedral ^{1}	Cologne	Gothic Cathedral	6.0 million (2004)
2	Reichstag building	Berlin	Bundestag	2.70 million (2006)
3	Hofbräuhaus	Munich	Brewery	1.80 million
4	Heidelberg Castle	Heidelberg	Renaissance architecture	
5	Neuschwanstein Castle	Schwangau	Bavarian King Ludwig II's castle	1.5 million (2018)
6	Zwinger and Gemäldegalerie Alte Meister	Dresden	Dresden State Art Collections	
7	Fernsehturm	Berlin	TV and observation tower	
8	Aachen Cathedral ^{1}	Aachen	Holy Roman Imperial Cathedral	1.5 million

Note: This list only includes physical landmarks with 1.0 million visitors per year or more. This list may be incomplete.

^{1} World Heritage Site in Germany

=== Theme parks ===
The table below shows some of the most visited theme parks or related facilities in Germany.

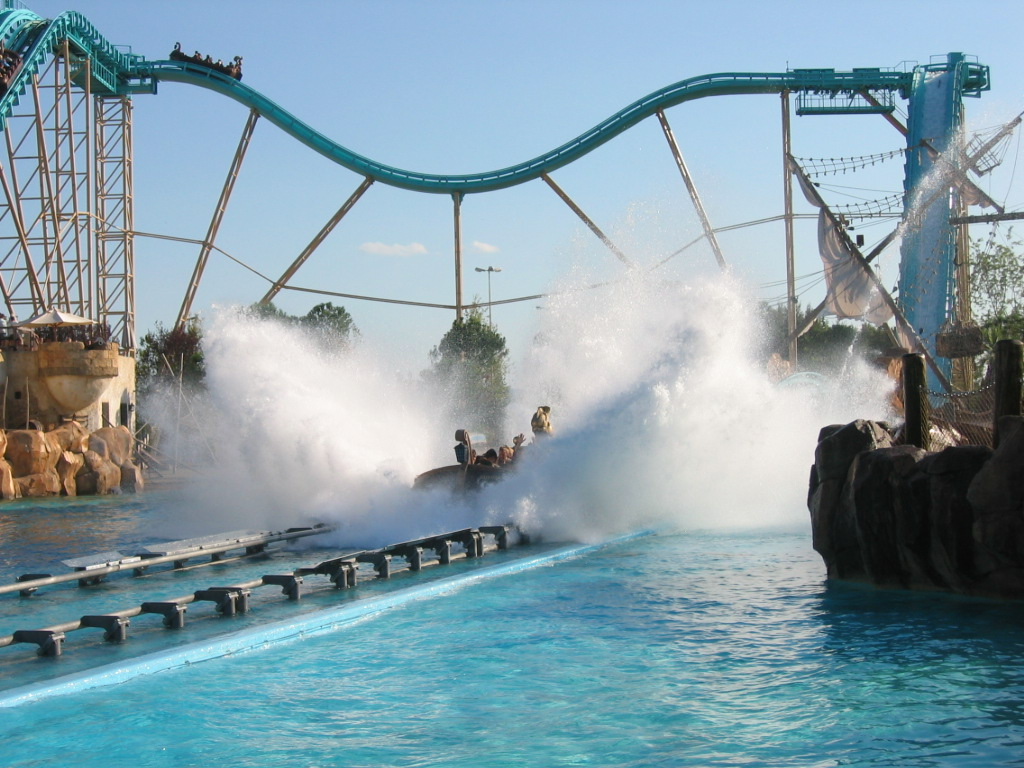
Atlantica SuperSplash in Europa-Park

Name	Location	Type	# of visitors in 2002	# of visitors in 2008
Europa-Park	Rust	Amusement park	3.5 million	4.0 million
Berlin Zoological Garden	Berlin	Zoo		3.0 million
VW Autostadt	Wolfsburg	Automobile park		2.1 million
Nürburgring	Nürburg	Formula One park	2.0 million	
Therme Erding	Erding	Water park	1.5 million	
Movie Park Germany	Bottrop	Amusement park	1.3 million	
Legoland Deutschland	Günzburg	Miniature park	1.3 million	
Leipzig Zoological Garden "Zoo of the future"	Leipzig	Zoo	1.2 million	2.1 million
Phantasialand	Brühl	Amusement park		1.75 million
Heide Park Resort	Soltau	Amusement park		1.6 million
Deutsches Museum	Munich	Museum	1.4 million	
Hamburg Planetarium	Hamburg	Planetarium		0.4 million

Note: This list only includes the largest theme parks/facilities in selected categories. This list may be incomplete.

== See also ==
- Transport in Germany
- Public holidays in Germany
- List of museums in Germany
- Economy of Germany
- Cuisine of Germany
- Tourism in East Germany
- German tourism industry
- List of World Heritage Sites in Germany
