= Fujitsu Technology Solutions =

Munich-based information technology vendor

- Type: Subsidiary
- Industry: Computer hardware IT Services
- Founded: 1999 (as Fujitsu Siemens Computers), 2009 (as Fujitsu Technology Solutions)
- Headquarters: Munich, Germany
- Key people: Rod Vawdrey (CEO), Joseph Reger (CTO)
- Owner: Fujitsu
- Number of employees: 5,087 (2011)
- Website: www.fujitsu.com/fts

Fujitsu Technology Solutions GmbH (FTS) is a Munich-based information technology vendor in the so-called "EMEIA" markets: Europe, the Middle East, Africa, plus India. A subsidiary of Fujitsu in Tokyo, FTS was founded in 2009 when the parent firm bought out Siemens' 50% share of Fujitsu Siemens Computers.

== Products and services ==
Fujitsu Technology Solutions provides a broad range of information and communications technology based products.

=== Current ===
Fujitsu Technology Solutions' current products and services include:

- Media Center
  - ESPRIMO Q
- Notebooks
  - CELSIUS
  - LIFEBOOK
- Desktop PC
  - ESPRIMO
- Workstation
  - CELSIUS
- Tablet PC
  - STYLISTIC
- Convertible PC
  - LIFEBOOK T
- Industry Standard Servers
  - PRIMERGY
  - PRIMERGY BladeFrame
- Mission critical IA-64 servers
  - PRIMEQUEST
- UNIX system based servers
  - SPARC Enterprise Servers
  - PRIMEPOWER 250, 450, 900, 1500, 2500
- Storage
  - ETERNUS
- S/390-compatible Mainframes
  - S- series, SX- series
- Flat panel displays
- Operating systems
  - SINIX: Unix variant, later renamed Reliant UNIX, available for RISC and S/390-compatible platforms
  - BS2000: EBCDIC-based operating system for SPARC, x86 and S/390-compatible systems
  - VM2000: EBCDIC-based hypervisor for S/390-compatible platform, capable of running multiple BS2000 and SINIX virtual machines

=== Discontinued ===
Fujitsu Technology Solutions' discontinued products and services include:

- Media Center
  - ACTIVY
- Notebooks
  - AMILO (2000s)
  - AMILO PRO
  - ESPRIMO Mobile
  - Liteline
  - Mobile
  - SCENIC Mobile
- Desktop PC
  - SCALEO
  - SCENIC
  - AMILO DESKTOP
- Handheld
  - Pocket LOOX
- Flat panel displays:
  - Myrica
    - Liquid crystal display televisions
    - Plasma display televisions
  - SCALEOVIEW
    - Liquid crystal display computer monitors
  - SCENICVIEW
    - Liquid crystal display computer monitors

=== Product Compliance Laboratory ===
Fujitsu Technology Solutions operates a product compliance laboratory which is used in house and by third parties.

== See also ==
- List of computer system manufacturers
- List of Fujitsu products
