= List of Fujitsu products =

Fujitsu, a multinational computer hardware and IT services company, provides services and consulting as well as a range of products including computing products, software, telecommunications, microelectronics, and more. Fujitsu also offers customized IT products that go beyond the off-the shelf products listed below.

== Products and services ==
Product category	Fujitsu products
Database	FUJITSU Enterprise Postgres: FUJITSU is a “major contributor” to open source Postgres. Fujitsu engineers have also developed an Enterprise Postgres version called Fujitsu Enterprise Postgres. Fujitsu Enterprise Postgres benefits include Enterprise Support; warranted code; High Availability enhancements; security enhancements (end to end transparent data encryption, data masking, auditing); Performance enhancements (In-Memory Columnar Index provides support for HTAP (Hybrid transactional/analytical processing) workloads); High-speed Backup and Recovery; High-speed data load; Global metacache (improved memory management); Oracle compatibility extensions (to assist migration from Oracle to Postgres). Fujitsu Enterprise Postgres can be deployed on X86 (Linux.Windows), IBM z/IBM LinuxONE; it is also packaged as a RedHat OpenShift (OCP) container.
Cloud computing	FUJITSU Cloud IaaS Trusted Public S5, FUJITSU Cloud A5 for Windows Azure, FUJITSU Cloud Integration Platform, Fujitsu Hybrid Cloud Solutions
PCs	ESPRIMO
Notebooks	LIFEBOOK
Slates	STYLISTIC
Thin clients	FUTRO, Zero Client
Workstations	Celsius
Servers	PRIMERGY, PRIMEQUEST
Mainframe computers	GlobalServer GS21, BS2000, OpenVME.
Supercomputers	K Computer, Fugaku, VP Series
Storage	ETERNUS
Software	Interstage, Systemwalker, Symfoware Server, Glovia G2, Glovia On Demand, SCIGRESS
Services	Consulting, Customer support, Education Services, Managed Services, Technology Services and Solutions
Telecommunications	Multi-layer Convergence, LTE, Network Management and Network Planning
Smartphones	Android series (ARROWS, REGZA, STYLISTIC), Windows Phone series
Microelectronics	Microcontrollers, ASSPs (application-specific ICS) System Memory, ASICs/Wafer Foundry Services, and optical components
Scanners	fi, ScanSnap
Point of sale equipment	TeamPos, TeamPad
Pointing devices	ErgoTrac
Car audio, video, navigation and control systems	Fujitsu Ten
HVAC	Halcyon Hybrid Flex Inverter (HFI), Airstage
