= Tanaka Shōzō =

Japanese politician

- 田中 正造
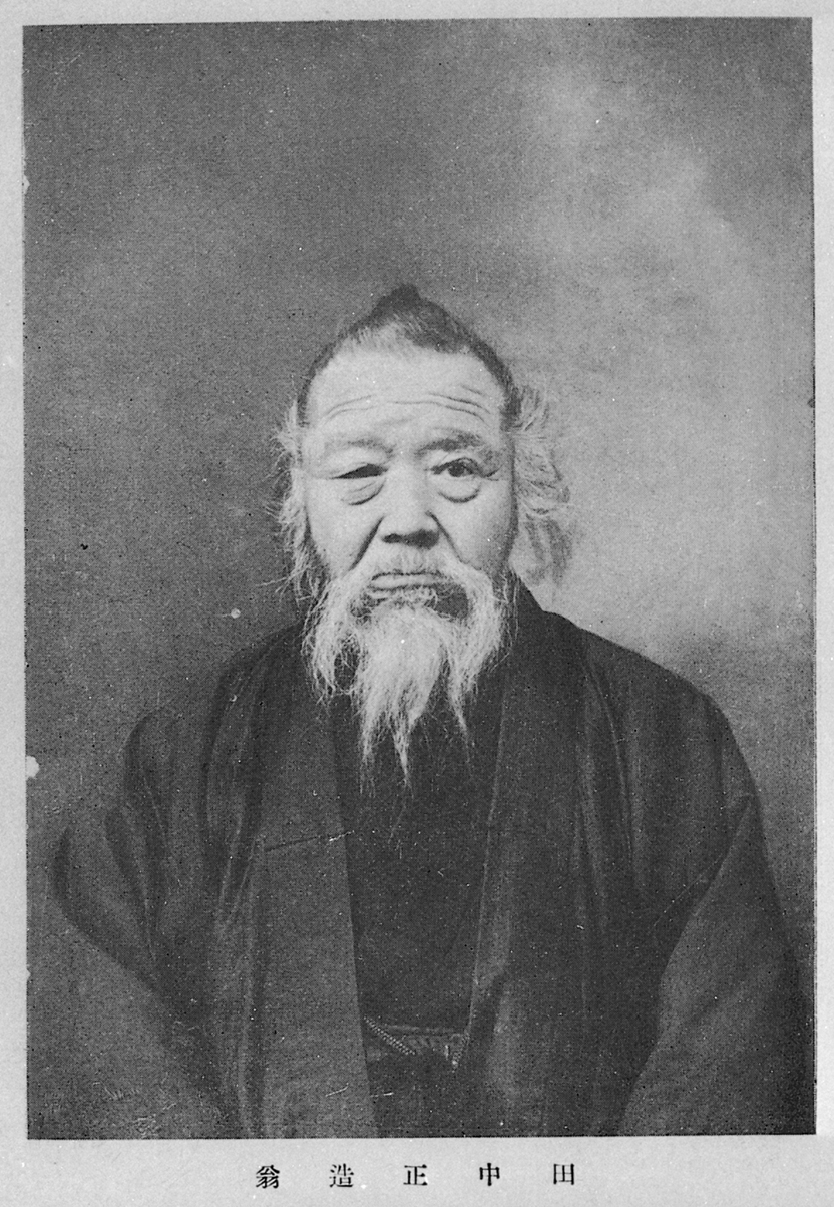
- Shōzō Tanaka

Member of the House of Representatives
- In office 1 July 1890 – 23 October 1901
- Preceded by: Constituency established
- Succeeded by: Jōkichi Tatenuma
- Constituency: Tochigi 3rd

Personal details
- Born: 15 December 1841 Sano, Tochigi, Japan
- Died: 4 September 1913 (aged 71) Sano, Tochigi, Japan
- Party: Rikken Kaishintō (1882–1896)
- Other political affiliations: Shimpotō (1896–1898); Kensei Hontō (1898–1900)
- Occupation: Politician, Environmental activist

Shōzō Tanaka (田中 正造, Tanaka Shōzō; 15 December 1841 – 4 September 1913) was a Japanese politician and social activist, and is considered to be Japan's first conservationist. Tanaka was politically active in the Meiji Restoration and leader in the Freedom and Popular Rights Movement. In Japan's first general election of 1890, he was elected to the House of Representatives as a member of the Rikken Kaishintō, a liberal political party. He is most well known for his advocacy of rural residents around the Watarase River whose health and livelihoods were negatively affected by pollution from the Ashio Copper Mine in the 1880s. Tanaka also contributed to philosophical thought on nature in the early Meiji era.

== Early life ==
Tanaka was born in the Watarase River Basin. He was raised by his father, the headman of Konaka Village and principal of the Jōrenji Temple school in present-day Sano, Tochigi. Tanaka struggled with reading and writing in school, however, he excelled in aural memorization. For example he had the Confucian Analects and Mencius committed to memory. He was an apt farmer and engaged in some entrepreneurial farming projects during his youth. His community came to know Tanaka for his steadfast sense of judgement and responsibility. In 1857, Tanaka's father was promoted to superintendent of the eight villages that made up the domain. Even at the age of 17, Tanaka's village was happy to elect him as headman in his father's place, where he served for twelve years.

== Political activism ==
Tanaka participated in the Freedom and Popular Rights Movement through his position as headman in the village of Kanaka.

The end of the Tokugawa era saw major changes r extensions in Japanese economic system, a national market, domestic trade, and the commercialization of agriculture. Such changes created a more stratified lower class, with village elites (Gono). As a headman, Tanaka rose up and challenged the system made up of shogun government controlling the domain which encompassed his village. One of the only ways of doing this was through petition, which, Tanaka dedicated himself to at the risk of his own life. In 1890, Gono took over local prefectural assemblies. These assemblies pushed against the oligarchical government and made demands on behalf of the peasant class they represented. The government halfway relented to these demands; however, it came at the expense of the Freedom and Popular Rights Movement. Although it took 10 years, successes of the prefectural assemblies eventually included a constitution from the emperor and an elected body.

In May 1868, Tanaka was imprisoned for challenging a higher-ranking official. Tanaka submitted a petition which called for the official’s arrest for the embezzlement of government money. In prison, Tanaka was tortured. He was forced to maintain to stress positions for extensive periods of time and survived for 30 days by licking a stick of dried bonito. Tanaka was convicted of, "...disturbing the peace of the Fief, betraying the trust of his position (as Headman of Kanaka), plotting in a nefarious manner and submitting presumptuous petitions...". He was released from prison in 1869.

After being released from prison, Tanaka taught in a small shrine. He studied with Oda Takizaburō in Tokyo before leaving for Iwate Prefecture. In 1870, Tanaka was arrested in relation to the murder of a man named Kimura. A biography about Tanaka Shozo, Ox Against the Storm by Kenneth Strong, contends that the blame shifted upon Tanaka was wrongful and likely due to his isolated position as an "...ex-peasant, with no samurai connections to protect him..." Kimura's son was eventually cross-examined and asserted that he had seen the killer before he left and that it could not have been Tanaka. He was placed in Iwate prison where he studied Jean Jacques Rousseau’s (1712–78) Du Contrat Social (1762) and Samuel Smiles’s (1812–1904) Self-Help (1859). He was released in April 1874.

In 1879, he founded the Tochigi Shimbun (or Tochigi News), a periodical in which he discussed human rights and contemporary issues.

Tanaka became a member of the Tochigi Prefectural Assembly in 1880, and served as its Chairman in 1886.

In the General Election of 1890, the first ever held in Japan, Tanaka was elected to the House of Representatives as a member of the Rikken Kaishintō, a liberal political party.

In 1902, Tanaka engaged in a political battle against the second Pollution Prevention Committee, which was an attempt to shift the blame of contamination from the Ashio Copper Mine incident to the movement of the river, "...they had concluded that only amounts of soluble copper were still reaching the rivers from the mine, committee held that the cause of current suffering was not mining, but flooding that agitated the polluted mud, allowing the embedded insoluble copper to escape and cause damage." The second Pollution Prevention Committee adopted a zero tolerance policy on flooding, asserting that the Watarase and Tone Valleys, historically Japan's most fertile agriculture zones, were ill suited to agriculture and required massive reengineering to make the river system flood-proof. This schema nationalized rivers and required a village called Yanaka to be demolished to make way for a flood control reservoir. Tanaka moved to Yanaka and protested these measures. He did so through a philosophical discourse portending the ineffectuality and hostility of such measures. See philosophy section for more. This was Tanaka's final political campaign before death.

== Ashio Copper Mine activism ==
Tanaka is known for his anti-pollution activism and often referenced as Japan's first conservationist.

Tanaka is best known for his advocacy in connection with the pollution caused by waste from the Ashio Copper Mine owned by Furukawa Ichibei. The events resulting from the mine's industrial waste are considered to be Japan's first experience with industrial scale pollution and the birth of Japan's environmental movement. Tanaka's early political efforts in 1891-1892 involved questioning the inviolability of property rights versus the public rights in article 27 of the Meiji Constitution.

In the mid-1880s, people located on the watersheds near the mine, such as Watarase and Tone watersheds, began to observe and experience negative effects of the industrial pollution from the mine, such as dying fish populations, poor harvests, and ill health. In 1890, a large flood carried poisonous wastes from the mine into surrounding areas. The effects on the communities and industries in the area were deleterious, “Copper, arsenic, mercury and a host of other pollutants from the Ashio mine located at the headwaters of the Watarase river entered the river and destroyed significant agricultural, fishing and artisanal (silk, indigo) industries in the watershed.” In 1891, after having been elected to the National Diet via Japan’s first parliamentary elections, Tanaka gave a famous speech questioning why the Meiji government had not suspended Ashio's operations based on the Meiji Constitution’s guarantees of individual property rights.

An activist uprising consisting of farmers, fishing households, soil scientists, Tokyo intellectuals, nationalists, anarchists, Christian socialists, and early Marxists developed against the environmental pollution caused by the mine. Tanaka was at the center of the farmers movement and also a member of the Diet. In 1891, Tanaka raised questions in the Diet as to the cause of the damage. Some historians assert that the National Diet had financial ties to the Ashio Copper Mine. In Trends on Ecology in Japan since 17th Century, author Ui Jun states, “... [the government's response to the Ashio Copper Mine was] not clear and superficial, because high-ranked officers had the vested interest with the mine, and copper was strategic important export product.”

In 1900, villagers in the valley of the Watarase River, downstream from the mine, planned a mass protest in Tokyo, but were rebuffed by government troops and forced to disperse.

In 1901, Tanaka resigned from the Diet. At 11:20 on the morning of 10 Dec 1901, Tanaka attempted to perform a jikiso, “...an illegal, out-of-channels direct appeal to the sovereign punishable by death.” As an act of sacrifice, he attempted to deliver a petition written by himself and radical journalist Kotoku Shusui, directly to Emperor Meiji, who was returning to his residence from the 17th session of the Diet. He was arrested, placed in jail for the night, evaluated for mental stability, and then released. Newspapers ran editorials and front page news stories about the “Jikiso Scandal” the following day.

One success of this activism was the 1897 Third Mine Pollution Prevention Order. The order directed Furukawa, owner of the mine, to make mitigation efforts to control erosion and prevent waste from getting into the Watarase River.

In 1911, the Diet passed the Factory Law, requiring factory inspectors to conduct pollution control. This law was Japan's first law to address industrial pollution; however, Tanaka was unsatisfied with the little impact the law made by the laws weak wording.

== Philosophy ==
Tanaka was a leader in a larger movement re-conceptualizing nature during the Meiji period. His activism associated with the Ashio Copper Mine touches on the Freedom and People's Rights Movement's ideologies of Natural Rights and Utilitarianism, ultimately leading to the development of environmental politics in Japan.

Tanaka’s political activism against the 1896 River Law led to the development of his ecological philosophy and terminology; poison (Doku) and flow (Nagare). This philosophy is described by Robert Stolz as an "...ecological theory of society based on the twin processes of nature..." In relation to the 1896 River Law, which sought to remake the Kanto Plain, Doku represented the unnatural damming of the river and the inevitable build-up of poisons in the watershed, while Nagare represented the natural way of things. Through his ideas on river flow, Tanaka predicted real engineering problems the dam would face. Tanaka believed his philosophy to be applicable, not only to nature, but to social and political situations as well.

Tanaka further developed his environmental philosophy upon moving to Yanaka, where he pioneered the philosophy of Yanakagaku (Yanaka studies). "Yanakagaku was meant to be a method of living in harmony with nature’s flows." According to Yanakagaku thought, the Japanese state's construction of dams and sluices inhibits the natural flow of the river, thereby increasing Doku. He studied ecology with the Tochigi water control research group by walking and surveying the river catchment. He died on tour of this practice.

== Later life ==
Tanaka was a supporter of local autonomy and the primacy of agriculture. He spent the rest of his life developing a unique environmental philosophy and encouraging villagers to protest against various environmentally harmful construction projects. After leaving the Diet, he lived in Yanaka village, now a district of the city of Sano, until his death by stomach cancer in 1913. At the time of his death, Tanaka was penniless. His last possessions were an unfinished manuscript, a book of the New Testament, handkerchief paper, river nori, three pebbles, three diaries, a bound copy of the Meiji Constitution, and the Gospel of Matthew in a cloth bag.

== See also ==
- Reforestation
