= Hengtong =

Chinese power and fiber optic cable manufacturer

Hengtong Group
- Type: Public
- Traded as: SSE: 600487
- Industry: Power and fiber optic cable
- Founded: Sino-Japanese Joint Venture Wujiang Miaodu Optical Cable Co., Ltd. (October 1993)
- Founder: Cui Genliang
- Headquarters: Suzhou, China,
- Revenue: 7.8 billion RMB (2012)
- Website: www.hengtonggroup.com

Hengtong (SSE: 600487) or Hengtong Group is China's largest power and fiber optic cable manufacturer. In 2025, Hengtong Ranked No. 386 in the World's 500 Most Influential Brands list by World Brand Lab.

It is listed as the 7th largest manufacturer in market research firm Integer's 2017 Top 100 Global Wire & Cable Producers and the only Chinese cable manufacturer to make the ranking's top 10.

The company claimed the top spot with annual revenue growth of 46.5% from 2008 to 2012 in a report by the Association of Chartered Certified Accountants titled "China's Next 100 Global Giants", a ranking of Chinese businesses with the most global growth potential.

== History ==
The company was founded in 1991 and in 2003 was listed on the Shanghai Stock Exchange.

Hengtong Group was one of the first businesses in its province to establish a Communist Party branch within its organization. When it was established, Hengtong Group founder Cui Genliang stated his view that "Communism is a productive force." Hengtong Group's characterizes its core business mission as "serve the people and devote to society," a reference to Mao Zedong's speech Serve the People.

== Corporate structures ==
Hengtong Group has 70 subsidiaries.

=== Joint ventures ===
In 2010, the company formed Jiangsu OFS Hengtong Optical Technology Co., a joint venture with OFS, a US subsidiary of Furukawa Electric, to manufacture optical fiber preforms.

In 2012, the company announced a joint venture in Brazil with local cable manufacturer, Brascopper, to establish a manufacturing facility for fiber optic cable in Mato Grosso do Sul. Hentong will hold 51% of the JV, which was established to further the company's goal of expanding in Brazil and the rest of Latin America.

Hengtong purchased a 51% in Huawei Marine Networks (a joint venture with Global Marine Systems of the UK from 2008), due to U.S. sanctions on Huawei.
