= OFS =

OFS may stand for:

== Education ==
- The Office for Students, the government regulator for the higher education sector in England
- Overseas Family School, a school in Singapore
- Orley Farm School, a North-London prep school

== Finance ==
- Oklahoma Office of State Finance
- Office of Financial Stability

== Computing ==
- Amiga Old File System
- Object File System, a Microsoft project in the 1990s

== Places ==
- Orange Free State, an independent country in 19th century South Africa
- Orange Free State, a province of South Africa from 1910 to 1994
- Free State Province, a province of South Africa since 1994, called Orange Free State from 1994 to 1995

== Business ==
- Schlumberger Oilfield Services, a division of Schlumberger Limited
- OFS (company), an American technology company

== Other ==
- Old Frisian (ISO 639-3 code)
- Ottawa Fire Service
- Operation Freedom's Sentinel, a U.S. led counterterrorism mission in Afghanistan since Jan 1, 2015
- Secular Franciscan Order (Latin: Ordo Franciscanus Saecularis; abbreviated OFS)
- Oxford Symposium on Food and Cookery, also known as the Oxford Food Symposium
