= Ashio Copper Mine =

Former mine in Japan

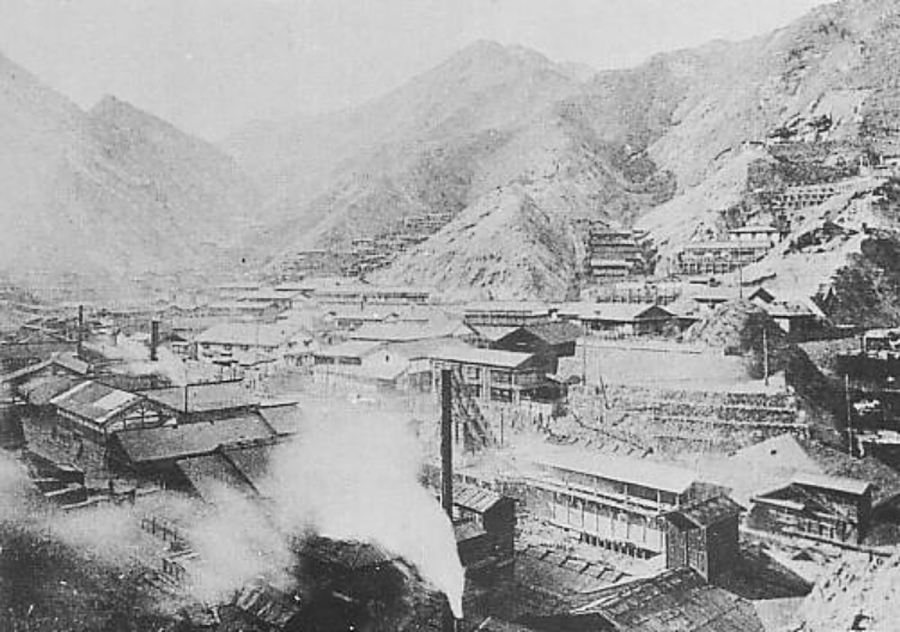
- Ashio Copper Mine circa 1895

- Location within Tochigi Prefecture Location within Japan
- Location: Ashio, Tochigi, Japan; 36°38′0″N 139°26′23″E
- Products: Copper
- Opened: Before 1600
- Closed: 1973
- National Historic Site of Japan

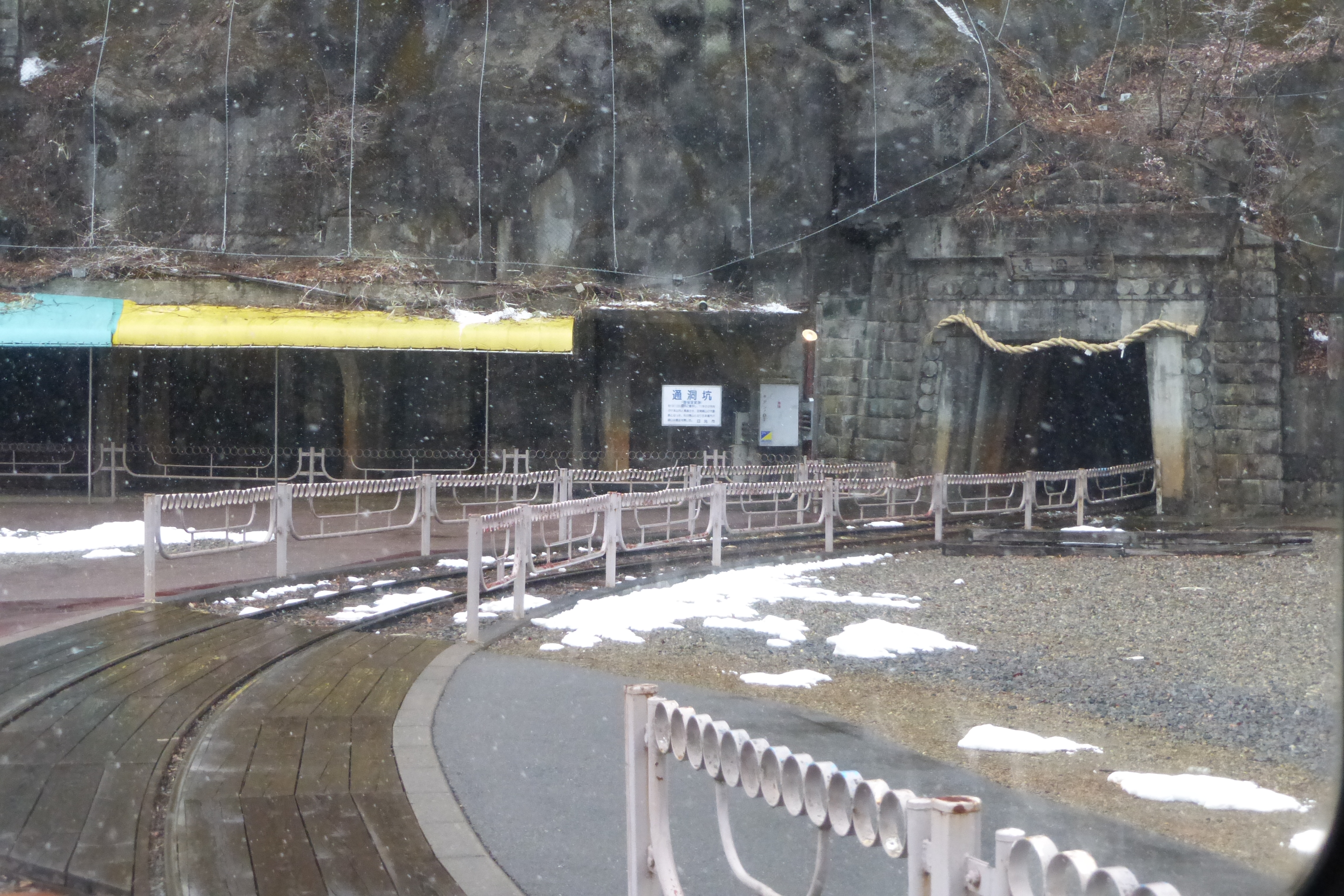
Contemporary photograph of the mine entrance, 2015

The Ashio Copper Mine (足尾銅山, Ashio-dōzan) is a former copper mine located in the town of Ashio, Tochigi (now part of the city of Nikkō, Tochigi), in the northern Kantō region of Japan. It was the site of Japan's first major pollution disaster in the 1880s and the scene of the 1907 miners' riots. The pollution disaster led to the birth of the Japanese environmental movement and the 1897 Third Mine Pollution Prevention Order. It also triggered changes in the mine's operations, which had played a role in the 1907 riots, part of a string of mining disputes in 1907. During World War II the mine was worked by POW forced labor.

== History ==
Copper deposits are recorded as having been discovered in the area around the year 1550, but exploitation did not begin until two local households received an official permit in 1610 to establish a mine. In 1611, copper from the site was presented to officials of the shogunate; and shortly thereafter, Ashio was officially listed as a copper mine belonging to the Tokugawa shogunate. Copper, including that produced at the Ashio mine, played an important role in the solidification of Tokugawa rule in the early part of the 1600s and later became Japan's chief metal export after 1685. Copper from the mine was used in the minting of Kan'ei Tsūhō copper coins and in the roofing for the Shoganate's temple of Zōjō-ji in Edo. At its peak, the mine produced about 1,200 tons annually; however, Japan's mining industry began to decline during the latter part of the Edo period and the Ashio mine was almost closed at the time of the Meiji restoration. It became privately owned in 1871 following the industrialization initiated by the Meiji restoration, by which time production had dropped to less than 150 tons per year. In 1877, however, it became the property of Furukawa Ichibei, who then used the financial backing of Shibusawa Eiichi and the finding of new veins of copper to modernize and expand the mine with modern technology and foreign mining engineering expertise. By the 1880s production had increased dramatically, reaching 2286 tons by 1884, which accounted for 26 percent of Japan's copper production. A year later, the mine was producing over nine million tons, and by the end of the century, it accounted for 40 percent of Japan's copper production. During the Meiji period, arsenic trioxide became a major secondary product of the mine, and large amounts of sulfuric acid was also used for minerals extraction.

In the aftermath of the Ashio Copper Mine Incident and the Mining Pollution Prevention Ordinance of 1897, the mine owners replaced their previous expansion-focused policy with a policy of stabilization and retrenchment.

Over three days in February 1907, miners at the mine rioted over low wages and poor working conditions. Damage from the riot totaled over 283,000 yen.

The Ashio mine's Excavation Department was closed in 1973, after centuries of mining and the introduction of foreign copper ore into the Japanese market. By this time, the total length of its tunnels and shaft had reached 1234 kilometers.

During World War II, Javanese, Australian and United States prisoners of war were forced to work at the mine. US prisoners included survivors from the Bataan Death March and submarines Sculpin, Grenadier, and S-44. The prison camp was liberated on 29 August 1945.

Smelting business continued at the mine using imported ore until 1989. Afterwards, the site was used for recycling industrial waste.

In 1980, the "Ashio Copper Mine Sightseeing" (a tourist attraction to convey the history the copper mine) and also the Furukawa Ashio History Museum were opened. In 2008, the mine received protection as a National Historic Site.

== Ashio Copper Mine incident ==
The Ashio copper mine incident is the name given to the environmental disaster that occurred as a result of the Ashio mining operations in the late 19th and early 20th centuries. This was Japan's first major pollution disaster, and has also been credited by historians as leading to the birth of the Japanese environmental movement.

=== Effects ===
As the Ashio Copper Mine's production boomed in the 1870s and 1880s, people living downstream from the mine, along the Watarase and Tone rivers, began to notice changes in the area around them. Colonies of silkworms were eating mulberry leaves from near the mine and dying, and farmers had noticed changes in the color of the Watarase River as early as the 1870s—just as the copper mine was expanding. The river's fish population was plummeting, which put around 3000 fishermen in the area out of work. In addition, shoring up mine shafts, fueling steam engines and copper smelters, and building other facilities for the expanding mine required wood, which in turn led to large-scale deforestation in the area, and meant that the towns downstream of the mines lost their flood protection. The first major flood came in 1890, and brought with it an unprecedented set of consequences. Instead of bringing a layer of silt that would help the next harvest, the 1890 flood brought silt contaminated by slag from the Ashio Copper Mine. This contaminated floodwater and silt destroyed all the vegetation it touched, rendered fields sterile, and caused workers in those fields to develop sores on their hands and feet. In 1896, a larger flood followed, causing still further environmental damage. Residents of the surrounding area also suffered multiple health issues, including sores where they came into contact with contaminated water or soil, chronic arsenic exposure, higher premature death rates, lower birth rates, and in the case of many women, trouble producing milk.

=== Cause ===
At the same time as the environmental damage was occurring in the Watarase River valley, the Ashio Copper Mine was expanding and modernizing. The expansion in the 1880s and 1890s had brought electrification, which had brought telephones, all matter of mechanized technology, several kinds of separators and smelters—including a massive Bessemer smelter, a railway, and steam engines to haul the copper. In addition to technological developments, the mine also shifted from Tokugawa-era processing methods to a process of mass extraction.

Emissions from the new smelters included sulfur dioxide, which caused lung damage in people and created acid rain that poisoned land and animals; and arsenic, which caused all manner of health problems when ingested. The new processing methods caused additional problems: Mass extraction produced piles of slag, which rainwater ran through and from which it absorbed chemicals. This rainwater found its way into nearby rivers, and from there into fields of crops which were then poisoned and suffocated.

=== Initial response ===
By the early 1890s, farmers and local politicians in the area surrounding the Ashio Copper Mine were becoming increasingly concerned with the pollution resulting from the mine. One of these local politicians was Shōzō Tanaka, who had been elected to the National Diet in 1890. In 1891, after the disastrous 1890 flood, he gave a speech on the floor of the Diet calling on the government to close the mine because of the pollution. The government did not respond. In 1892, He challenged the government again, and the government responded that there were plans in place at the mine to minimize further pollution and declared the issue to be closed. In the meantime, the engineers at the mine responded to local concerns by using dynamite to blast the piles of slag that were the byproducts of the mine's mass extraction. Regardless of their intentions, the blasting resulted in even more toxic chemicals entering the environment.

=== Problems continue and the government responds ===
In spite of promised plans to minimize pollution at the mine, environmental conditions in the vicinity of the Ashio Copper Mine continued to deteriorate. After additional severe flooding, local farmers petitioned minister of agriculture and commerce Enomoto Takeaki, as well as Japan's finance minister for relief, but were dismissed. In February 1897, Tanaka delivered a speech questioning Enomoto's behavior, which gained him support from several notable figures. Then, in March, dissatisfied farmers marched on Tokyo twice, with the second march comprising 4,000 participants.

The government was still slow to act, but it did act. After visiting the area surrounding the mine and seeing the damage for himself, Enomoto eventually created a Pollution Investigation Committee. He then resigned on December 28, 1897. The result of almost a decade of protest was the 1897 Third Mine Pollution Prevention Order, which ordered the Furukawa Corporation, the mine's owner, to take action to prevent further toxins from leaking into the Watarase River. In addition, the government, headed by Ōkuma Shigenobu, put plans for reforestation of the area surrounding the Ashio Copper Mine.

=== Aftermath ===
After the 1897 Third Mine Pollution Prevention Order, the response from the company caused miners at Ashio to fear that the order was threatening their jobs.

Within four years of the passage of the 1897 order, Tanaka was complaining about the order as well. Having observed that the environmental damage in the area surrounding the mine had continued to increase in spite of the order, he continued to call for the mine to be closed. Several times through the beginning of 1901, Tanaka questioned the government's response to the incident in the Diet. Then, in a speech in March 1901, he called the government treasonous over its treatment of the mine incident. After resigning from the Diet, he attempted to deliver a letter of appeal directly to Emperor Meiji himself. While Tanaka was prevented from handing over the letter, its contents were published by national newspapers, helping to publicise the plight of residents, which prompted the government to act. However the problem did not immediately go away, and protests continued for some years.

In 1902, another major flood occurred; but because of the Order, the floodwaters spread much less pollution than they had previously. In December of the same year, the creation of a basin to prevent further flood damage was discussed by the Japanese government's Pollution Prevention Committee. The location of this basin involved the destruction of the villages of Kawabe, Toshima, and Yanaka. Although the villages fought the proposition for two years, it was put into place in 1904. The government began buying out farmers in Yanaka in early 1906 and the destruction process began in 1907 and was completed in a few weeks. The basin that was created became a pond, Watarase Yusui-chi (渡良瀬遊水地), which became a UNESCO Ramsar site in 2012.

In 1911, the government passed the Factory Law, Japan's first law to address industrial pollution.

== 1907 Ashio Riot ==
The 1907 Ashio Riot occurred February 4–6, 1907, involved pit miners who had been demanding higher wages, and targeted mostly infrastructure and low-level mining officials. The riot resulted in higher wages and also triggered other strikes and riots in similar industries.

=== Background ===
==== Organization of the mine ====
The department with direct supervision over the pit miners was the Pits Department. The Pits Department was divided into four sections, three for the pits at Honzan, Tsūdō, and Kodaki, and one for a survey office responsible for gathering statistics on the other three sections. Each mine pit was divided into three sections: extraction, dressing, and general affairs, each with its own supervisor. Within the pits themselves, they were divided into 7 or 8 districts, with one guardpost for every one or two districts.

=== Rioting ===
==== February 4, 1907 ====
The riot began within the mine itself early on February 4, when a group of miners destroyed the foreman's cabin for sections 3 and 4 in the Tsūdō mine pits. From there, more miners joined in and destroyed infrastructure in sections 1 and 2. The miners then began to leave the mine pits in groups and assembled in front of cabin at the entrance. Other miners who were still underground began to come aboveground later in the afternoon, when they gathered in front of the Tsūdō office and threw rocks at the windows through the evening, at which point the rioting ended for the day. Meanwhile, the local police asked the prefect-level police for help with the riot and ordered the miners' bosses to control their men. The police resorted to negotiating with the miners at a distance, and the bosses only watched the goings-on out of fear they would be attacked too.

==== February 5, 1907 ====
Early the next day, miners attacked the cabins at the Sunokobashi mine pits, threatened the staff there, and cut telephone lines. Meanwhile, a large group of miners also gathered at the Honzan Ariki mine pits, where the electric trucks in the mine were stopped and some officials in one of the underground section cabins were injured. The extent of the damage from the first two days of the riot included several cabins and barns, eight trucks, a few drills, and the injured officials.

==== February 6, 1907 ====
At the Honzan Ariki mine pits, miners destroyed the underground foremen's cabins early in the morning before moving aboveground in two groups. They targeted the offices at the mine pits, and then moved to the company store and two departments at the center of the Ashio Copper Mine, where they looted the store and broke windows and doors at the departments. When Mine Director Minami Teizō arrived later that morning, the miners attacked him. He managed to escape and hide while rioting miners attacked his house, but was attacked again when he tried to flee. He was then taken to the hospital and the miners left.

At the same time, miners began to target company officials. The riot also spread to include bystanders who were more interested in the looting than the officials. By the late afternoon, the fuel warehouse was set on fire. Meanwhile, the local and prefecture-level police were unable to come up with a plan to respond to the riot, more police had been ordered to the area, and the prefecture's governor had requested military assistance in responding to the riot. The troops left for Ashio late on the 6th, and arrived in the afternoon the next day.

=== Aftermath ===
==== February 7, 1907 ====
Three companies of troops arrived at Ashio after the riot had ended. Once they arrived, the local police began conducting searches through the miners' shacks in Hozan, which had been the center of the riots. From February 7 through February 9, authorities arrested 628 individuals, 182 of whom were prosecuted.

==== February 10, 1907 ====
On the afternoon of February 10, the pit managers at Hozan and Tsūdō informed the miners' representatives that the company would be firing all miners at both pits and requiring them to submit requests for rehiring by the next day. After debate, the majority of the miners accepted the company's demand and submitted the requests. On the afternoon of February 12, the company announced who they were and were not rehiring. The majority of the miners were rehired.

==== Wage increases ====
In the days after the mine resumed operations on February 13, miners at Kodaki, the only pits where rioting did not occur, became increasingly uneasy. They wanted to know why they were being affected by the riot's consequences if they had not participated. On February 26 the new mine director, Kondō Rikusaburō, informed the miners at Kodaki that they would be receiving bonuses for their non-involvement in the riot.

On February 27 and 28, Kondō Rikusaburō visited the Hozan and Tsūdō mine pits to inform the miners that wage increases were coming and bonuses would be paid to the miners who were not involved in the riot. The wage increases were officially announced on March 1 and involved an average raise of 19.4 percent and improved financial provisions for absences related to injury or illness.

==== Other mining disputes ====
The riot at the Ashio Copper Mine triggered a series of riots and strikes at other mines, including at the Horonai mine in May 1907, the Besshi mine in June 1907, and at others through July.

== See also ==
- Four Big Pollution Diseases of Japan
- Minamata environmental disaster
- Tochigi–Gunma–Saitama border
