= Fujitsu Celsius =

Line of workstation computers made by Fujitsu

The Fujitsu Celsius is a line of laptop and workstation computers manufactured by Fujitsu. The brand name has also been used for graphic accelerators.

The laptops have Intel Core vPro, i5, or i7 processors, while the workstations have one or two Intel Xeon processors.

== History and usage ==
The computers are intended for applications such as computer-aided design, digital content creation, geographical information systems work, architecture, engineering, financial forecasting, flux balance analysis, scientific simulation, electronic design, and virtual reality.

Fujitsu Celsius equipment was used to stitch together thousands of individual photographic images to create large-scale 360-degree panoramic images: an 80-gigapixel image of London was published in November 2010, stating: “using this excellent workstation allowed this record-breaking photo to be created a few weeks faster than would have been possible on any other available PC.” The 320-gigapixel photomosaic of London published in February 2013 was prepared on a Celsius R920 in three months' time.

== Models ==
=== Desktops ===
Celsius R630 specs

Celsius R920 - 2012's model; The R920 is able to accept up to 512 GB of RAM.

=== Laptops ===
Celsius H710 and Celsius H910 - 2011's models.

TFTS, “Fujitsu Brings Out Pair Of New Laptops, The Celsius H710 And The Celsius H910 [Described As Workstation Laptops, Fujitsu's New Hardware Offers Variety Of Configurations And High Power]”, Steve Anderson, May 23, 2011.

Fujitsu Celsius H760 Workstation Review It is equipped with an Intel Xeon E3-1505M v5 4c/8t 4 x 2.8 - 3.7 GHz, Skylake, a NVIDIA Quadro M2000M - 4 GB VRAM GPU, 16GB of RAM, + 2 free Slots, a 512 GB SSD, Display 15.60 inch 16:9, 1920 x 1080 pixel 141 PPI, LGD046F LP156WF6-SPP1, IPS LED, Weight 2,98kg

Fujitsu Celsius H780 (i7-8850H, P2000, FHD) Workstation Review It is equipped with an Intel Core i7-8850H 6c/12t 6 x 2.6 - 4.3 GHz, Coffee Lake-H, an NVIDIA Quadro P2000 - 4 GB VRAM GPU, 16GB of RAM, max 128GB, a 512GB SSD, Display 15.60 inch 16:9, 1920 x 1080 pixel 141 PPI, LP156WF6-SPP1, IPS LED, Weight 2.752kg

Fujitsu Celsius H980 (Core i7-8750H, NVIDIA Quadro P3200) Workstation Review It is equipped with an Intel Core i7-8750H processor, an NVIDIA Quadro P3200 GPU, 16 GB of RAM and a 512 GB SSD Display 17.30 inch 16:9, 1920 x 1080 pixel 127 PPI, LG Philips, LP173WF4-SPF5, IPS LED, Weight 3.493kg

Fujitsu Celsius H970 (E3-1535M v6, P4000) Workstation Review It is equipped with an Intel Xeon E3-1535M v6 4c/8t 4 x 3.1 - 4.2 GHz, Kaby Lake, a VIDIA Quadro P4000 - 8 GB VRAM, 32GB of RAM, and a 512GB m.2 SSD, Display 17.30 inch 16:9, 1920 x 1080 pixel 127 PPI, LG Philips, LP173WF4-SPF3, IPS LED, Weight 3 kg

== See also ==
- Fujitsu Primergy servers and Fujitsu Esprim] desktops
- Dell Precision
- Lenovo ThinkStation
- Mac Pro
- HP Z
