= List of Fujitsu image scanners =

Fujitsu manufactures two series of image scanners: ScanSnap for consumers/SOHO, and fi for business (fi includes SP brand). Popular ScanSnap models include the S1300, a feature-rich scanner that can scan double-sided color originals, and the S1100, one of the world's smallest scanners. By September 2018, ScanSnap had sold more than five million units globally since 2001, and the ScanSnap brand reached the age of twenty years on July 10, 2021.

The following is a selection of scanners manufactured under the Fujitsu brand.

Note that Fujitsu's document scanner business, including the ScanSnap brand, was acquired bu Ricoh in 2022.

== Current models ==
Home scanners
Model	Speed (simplex/duplex)	Max scan size	ADF capacity	Resolution
ScanSnap S1300i	6 ppm / 12 ipm	8.5 x 14”	10 sheets	600 dpi (optical); 1200 dpi (software)
ScanSnap SV600	3 seconds per page	11.8 x 17”	n/a	285x218 dpi (horizontal); 283x152 dpi (vertical)

Office scanners
Model	Speed (simplex/duplex)	Daily Duty Cycle	Max scan size	ADF capacity	Resolution
fi-7300nx	60 ppm / 120 ipm	4,000 docs/day	8.5 x 14”	80 sheets	600 dpi (optical); 1200 dpi (software)
fi-7460	60 ppm / 120 ipm	9,000 docs/day	11 x 17”	100 sheets	600 dpi (optical); 1200 dpi (software)
fi-7480	80 ppm / 160 ipm	12,000 docs/day	11 x 17”	100 sheets	600 dpi (optical); 1200 dpi (software)
fi-7600	100 ppm / 200 ipm	30,000 docs/day	12 x 17”	300 sheets	600 dpi (optical); 1200 dpi (software)

High-speed scanners
Model	Speed (simplex/duplex)		Daily Duty Cycle	Max scan size	ADF capacity	Resolution
Model	Landscape	Portrait	Daily Duty Cycle	Max scan size	ADF capacity	Resolution
fi-7800	110 ppm / 220 ipm	90 ppm / 180 ipm	100,000 docs/day	12 x 17”	500 sheets	600 dpi (optical); 1200 dpi (software)
fi-7900	140 ppm / 280 ipm	105 ppm / 210 ipm	100,000 docs/day	12 x 17”	500 sheets	600 dpi (optical); 1200 dpi (software)

Flatbed scanners
Model	Speed (simplex/duplex)	Daily Duty Cycle	Flatbed area	ADF capacity	Resolution
fi-7280	80 ppm / 160 ipm	6,000 docs/day	8.5 x 11.69”	80 sheets	600 dpi (optical); 1200 dpi (software)
fi-7700	100 ppm / 200 ipm	30,000 docs/day	12 x 18”	300 sheets	600 dpi (optical); 1200 dpi (software)

== Discontinued models (but still eligible for extended service coverage) ==
Home scanners
Model	Speed (simplex/duplex)	Max scan size	ADF capacity	Resolution
fi-7030	27 ppm / 54 ipm	8.5 x 14”	50 sheets	600 dpi (optical); 1200 dpi (software)
ScanSnap iX1500	30 ppm	11 x 17”	50 sheets	600 dpi

Office Scanners
Model	Speed (simplex/duplex)	Daily Duty Cycle	Max scan size	ADF capacity	Resolution
fi-7140	40 ppm / 80 ipm	4,000 docs/day	8.5 x 14”	80 sheets	600 dpi (optical); 1200 dpi (software)
fi-7160	60 ppm / 120 ipm	4,000 docs/day	8.5 x 14”	80 sheets	600 dpi (optical); 1200 dpi (software)
fi-7180	80 ppm / 160 ipm	6,000 docs/day	8.5 x 14”	80 sheets	600 dpi (optical); 1200 dpi (software)

High-speed scanners
Model	Speed (simplex/duplex)		Daily Duty Cycle	Max scan size	ADF capacity	Resolution
Model	Landscape	Portrait	Daily Duty Cycle	Max scan size	ADF capacity	Resolution
fi-5950	135 ppm / 270 ipm	105 ppm / 210 ipm	100,000 docs/day	12 x 17”	500 sheets	600 dpi (optical); 1200 dpi (software)

Flatbed scanners
Model	Speed (simplex/duplex)	Daily Duty Cycle	Flatbed area	ADF capacity	Resolution
fi-7240	40 ppm / 80 ipm	3,000 docs/day	8.5 x 11.69”	80 sheets	600 dpi (optical); 1200 dpi (software)
fi-7260	60 ppm / 120 ipm	4,000 docs/day	8.5 x 11.69”	80 sheets	600 dpi (optical); 1200 dpi (software)

== Previous models ==
- ScanSnap S300 – portable scanner, 10 sheet ADF, 600 dpi optical resolution, 8 to 0.5 pages per minute depending on mode and AC availability
- ScanSnap S300M – Macintosh version of S300 with similar specifications
- ScanSnap S500
- ScanSnap S500M
- ScanSnap S510
- ScanSnap S510M
- ScanSnap S1100
- ScanSnap S1300
- ScanSnap S1500
- ScanSnap S1500M
- ScanSnap iX500 Deluxe

== Other ==
- SP-1425
