= Furukawa Electric =

Japanese company

Furukawa Electric Co., Ltd. 古河電気工業株式会社
- Type: Public K.K.
- Traded as: TYO: 5801; Nikkei 225 Component
- Industry: Electrical equipment
- Founded: Yokohama, Japan (1884; 142 years ago)
- Founder: Furukawa Ichibei
- Headquarters: Tokiwabashi Tower, 6-4, Otemachi 2-chome, Chiyoda-ku, Tokyo 100-8322, Japan
- Area served: Worldwide
- Key people: Mitsuyoshi Shibata (Chairman); Keiichi Kobayashi (President)
- Products: Automotive systems; Electronics equipment; Energy and industrial products; Metal and aluminum products
- Revenue: ▲$ 7.529 billion USD (FY 2017) (¥ 843.344 billion JPY) (FY 2017)
- Net income: ▲$ 1.136 billion USD (FY 2017) (¥ 115 billion JPY) (FY 2017)
- Number of employees: 2,050 (non-consolidated); 50,867 (consolidated) (as of March 31, 2022)
- Website: Official website

Furukawa Electric Co., Ltd. (古河電気工業株式会社, Furukawa Denkikōgyō Kabushiki-gaisha) is a Japanese electric and electronics equipment company.

== History ==
The company traces its origins to Furukawa Ichibei who founded Nikko Copper Works, a copper-smelting facility at Yokohama in 1884, which became part of Furukuwa Kogyo. A new company; Furukuwa Denki Kogyo, was formed in 1920, when it merged its copper business with its own Yokohama Wire Manufacturing Company, which it had acquired in 1908. So, the new company was able to combine its businesses of mining, refining, and making copper products, like wire and cable.

Furukawa was a Japanese businessman who founded one of the fifteen largest industrial conglomerates in Japan, called Furukawa zaibatsu, to which Furukawa Electric belongs to this day.

The company is listed on the Tokyo stock Exchange and is constituent of the Nikkei 225 stock index.

Furukawa Electric aids CERN's experiments on the search for the Higgs boson with its superconducting magnet wires. The company's products also include superconductivity cables.

As of July 2013 the company has 137 subsidiaries and affiliate companies across Japan, Europe, North and South America.

In 2025, Furukawa Electric will integrate its global fiber optic cable operations under a new brand: Lightera.

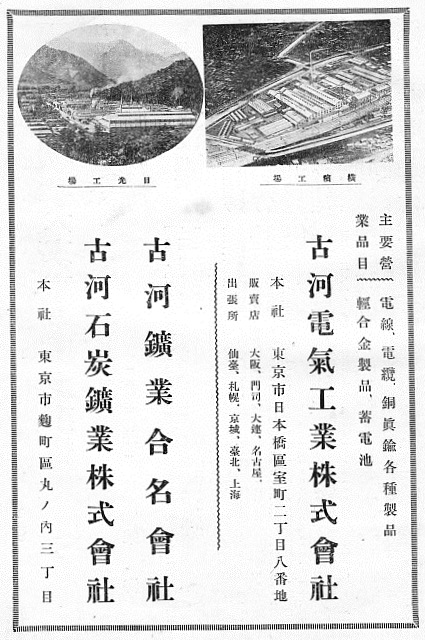
Furukawa Electric advertisement in 1930s

== Business segments and products ==
- Electronics and automotive systems
  - Wire harnesses and electronic components for automobiles
  - Components for electronic equipment
  - Magnet wires
- Energy and industrial products
  - Copper wire rods
  - Industrial power cables
  - Microcellular foam
  - Semiconductor processing tapes
- Light metals
  - Aluminum can stock
  - Aluminum tank materials for LNG vessels
  - Aluminum materials for semiconductor manufacturing equipment
  - Processed aluminum
- Metals
  - Copper foils
  - Wrought copper products for electronics
  - Copper tubes for air conditioning
  - Superconducting wires
- Telecommunications
  - Optical fibers and cables
  - Laser diode modules
  - Optical amplifiers
  - Networking equipments

== See also ==
- OFS (Company)
