= Furukawa Group =

Japanese industrial group

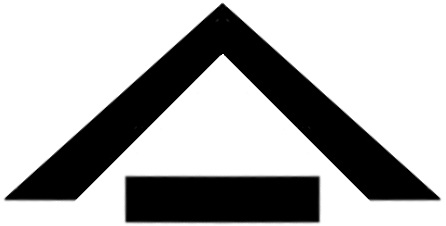
- Founder: Furukawa family

Furukawa Group (古河グループ, Furukawa Gurūpu) formerly Furukawa zaibatsu (古河財閥) is one of Japan's 15 largest industrial groups. Its origins date back to 1875, founder Furukawa Ichibei. This group specialized in mining, electronics, and chemicals industry before World War II.

Now, the predominant companies are Fuji Electric and Furukawa Electric as well as Fujitsu, FANUC, and Advantest. Other well-known companies include Yokohama Rubber.

== Member companies ==
- Furukawa Subgroup
  - 古河機械金属株式会社 Furukawa Co., Ltd. (Mining)
    - 古河林業株式会社 Furukawa Ringyo Co., Ltd. (Home and Wood)
    - 古河産機システムズ株式会社 Furukawa Industrial Machinery Systems Co., Ltd.
    - 株式会社トウペ Tohpe Corporation (Paint)
- Furukawa Electric Group
  - 古河電気工業株式会社 The Furukawa Electric Co.
    - 古河電池株式会社 Furukawa Battery Co.
    - 日本製箔株式会社 Nippon Foil Mfg. Co.
    - 古河産業株式会社 Furukawa Sangyo Kaisha
    - 古河物流株式会社 Furukawa Logistics Co.
    - 古河総合設備株式会社 Furukawa Engineering & Construction
    - 株式会社古河テクノマテリアル Furukawa Techno Material Co.
    - 古河AS株式会社 Furukawa Automotive Systems
    - 岡野電線株式会社 Okano Electric Wire Co.
    - ミハル通信株式会社 Miharu Communication Inc.
    - 古河サーキットフォイル株式会社 Furukawa Circuit Foil Co.
    - 超音波工業株式会社 Ultrasonic Engineering Co.
    - 関東電化工業株式会社 Kanto Denka Kogyo Co.
  - 株式会社ADEKA Adeka Corporation
    - 日本農薬株式会社 Nihon Nohyaku Co., Ltd.
  - Yokohama Rubber Company
  - Fuji Electric Holdings Co. (Group)
    - Fuji Electric
    - 富士電機リテイルシステムズ株式会社 Fuji Electric Retail Systems Co.
    - 富士電機アドバンストテクノロジー株式会社 Fuji Electric Advanced Technology Co
    - 富士電機ITソリューション株式会社 Fuji Electric IT Solutions Co.
    - 富士物流株式会社 Fuji Logistics Co., Ltd.
  - Fujitsu (Group)
    - Fujitsu Ten
    - FANUC Robotics, world's largest robotics company
    - Advantest, largest DRAM testing company
    - 株式会社富士通ビジネスシステム FUJITSU BUSINESS SYSTEMS Ltd.
    - 株式会社富士通アドバンストエンジニアリング FUJITSU ADVANCED ENGINEERING Ltd.
  - 日本軽金属株式会社 Nippon Light Metal Co., Ltd (Group)
    - 日本ギア工業株式会社 NIPPON GEAR CO., Ltd.
    - 日軽産業株式会社 Nikkei Sangyo Co., Ltd.
  - 日本ゼオン株式会社 Zeon Corporation (Group)
    - 渋沢倉庫株式会社 Shibusawa Warehouse Company, Ltd.
  - Asahi Mutual Life Insurance Co.
  - Mizuho Bank
  - Sompo Japan Insurance

=== Member companies which are in the Nikkei 225 ===
- Advantest
- FANUC
- Fuji Electric
- Fujitsu
- Furukawa Co., Ltd.
- Furukawa Electric
- Yokohama Rubber Company
