= Fujitsu Glovia Inc. =

CrescentOne is a supplier of enterprise resource planning (ERP) software for discrete manufacturing and a wholly owned subsidiary of Constellation Software International. The company is best known for its GLOVIA G2 software.

Primary markets for GLOVIA G2 are the OEM and the Tier 1, 2 and 3 manufacturers in a variety of industries, including aerospace and defense, automotive, electronics, capital equipment, make-to-order (MTO), engineer-to-order (ETO) and high-volume manufacturing.

== History ==
Founded in 1970 as Xerox Computer Services, Glovia International became a wholly owned subsidiary of Fog Software Inc. in 2021 Its GLOVIA G2 manufacturing ERP software was first launched in 1990 as Xerox Chess and the next generation version was released as GLOVIA G2 in 2010. Glovia Services Inc., an El Segundo, California-based software solutions provider, was a wholly owned subsidiary of Glovia International, Inc., and provided SaaS web-based ERP software. In 2015, Glovia International, Inc. changed its name to Fujitsu Glovia, Inc.In 2021 its name changed to CrescentOne Inc.

== GLOVIA G2 ==
Key areas of the GLOVIA G2 manufacturing ERP solution include product management, manufacturing, financials, customer management, supplier management, project management and business intelligence. Software as a service (SaaS) applications are accessed over the Internet. They also contributed to auditing and costing the computer systems for the 2008 Summer Olympics.
