= Fujitsu =

Japanese multinational technology company

Fujitsu Limited

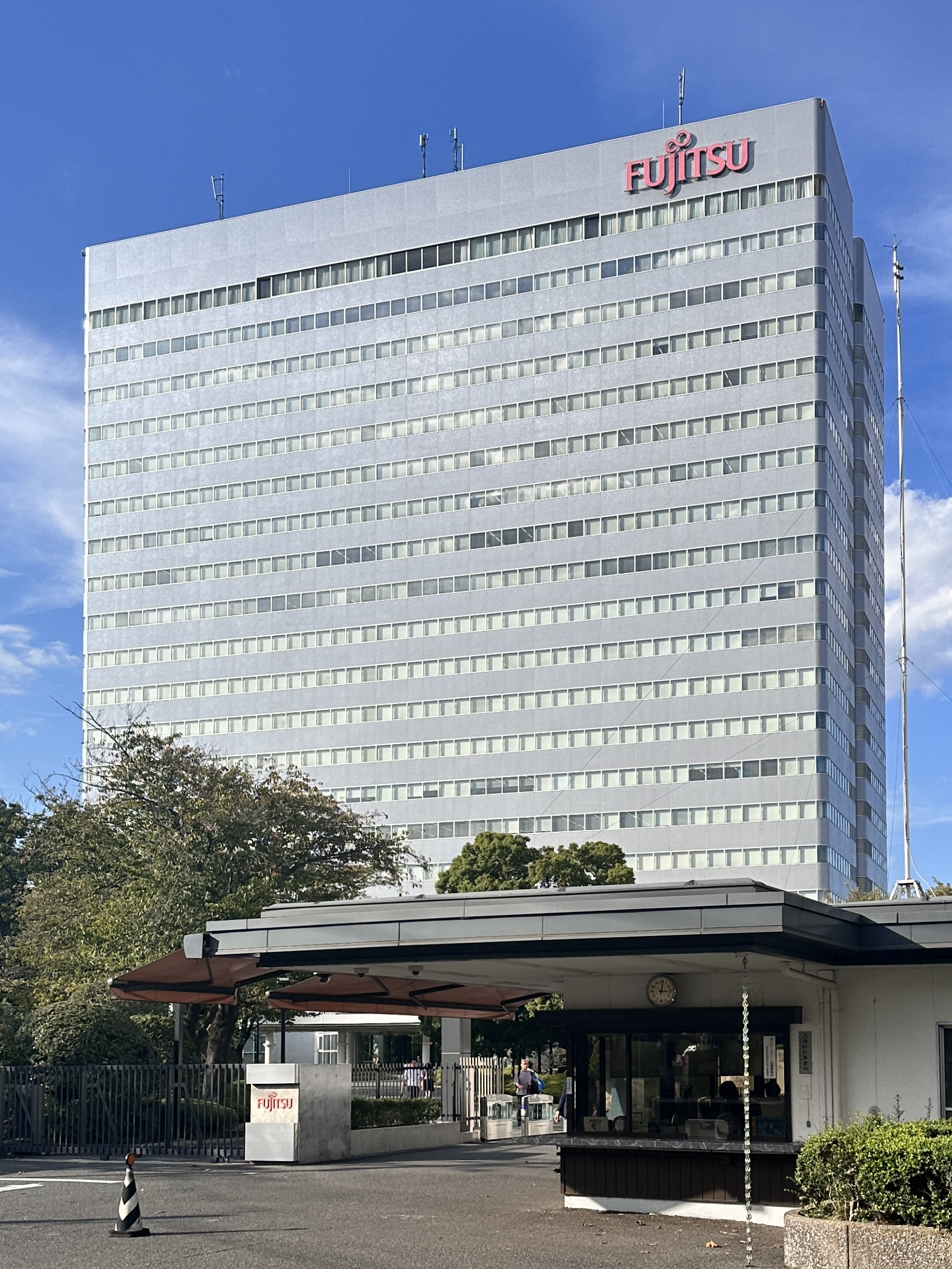
- Headquarters in Kawasaki, Kanagawa
- Native name: 富士通株式会社
- Romanized name: Fujitsū kabushiki gaisha
- Type: Public
- Traded as: TYO: 6702; NAG: 6702; Nikkei 225 component (TYO); TOPIX Large70 component (TYO)
- Industry: Information technology; IT consulting; Cloud computing; Telecommunications
- Founded: June 20, 1935; 91 years ago (as Fuji Telecommunications Equipment Manufacturing); Kawasaki, Kanagawa, Japan
- Headquarters: Nakahara-ku, Kawasaki, Kanagawa Prefecture, Japan
- Area served: Worldwide
- Key people: Takahito Tokita (president/CEO)
- Products: Enterprise servers; Supercomputers; Mainframes; Storage systems; Personal computers; Networking equipment
- Services: Digital transformation (Fujitsu Uvance); IT consulting; Managed services; System integration; Cloud computing; Cybersecurity
- Revenue: ▼¥3.5 trillion (US$22.13 billion) (2025)
- Operating income: ▲¥348.35 billion (US$2.2 billion) (2025)
- Net income: ▲¥449.42 billion (US$2.84 billion) (2025)
- Total assets: ▲¥3.55 trillion (US$22.45 billion) (2025)
- Total equity: ▲¥2.05 trillion (US$12.96 billion) (2025)
- Number of employees: 99,000 (2026)
- Parent: Furukawa Group
- Subsidiaries: PFU Limited; Fujitsu Technology Solutions; Fujitsu Glovia Inc.
- Website: global.fujitsu

Fujitsu Limited (富士通株式会社, Fujitsū kabushiki gaisha) is a Japanese multinational information and communications technology equipment and services corporation, established in 1935 and headquartered in Kawasaki, Kanagawa. It is the world's sixth-largest IT services provider by annual revenue, and it is the largest in Japan as of 2021.

Fujitsu's hardware offerings mainly consist of personal and enterprise computing products, including x86, ARM and mainframe-compatible server products. The corporation and its subsidiaries also offer diverse products and services in data storage, telecommunications, and advanced microelectronics. It has approximately 124,000 employees supporting customers in over 50 countries and regions.

Fujitsu is listed on the Tokyo Stock Exchange and Nagoya Stock Exchange; its Tokyo listing is a constituent of the Nikkei 225 and TOPIX 100 indices.

== History ==
=== 1935 to 2000 ===
Fujitsu was established on June 20, 1935, which makes it one of the oldest operating IT companies after IBM and before Hewlett-Packard, under the name Fuji Telecommunications Equipment Manufacturing (富士電気通信機器製造, Fuji Denki Tsūshin Kiki Seizō). The company was a spin-off of the Fuji Electric Company, which was founded in 1923 as a joint venture between the Furukawa Electric Company and the German conglomerate Siemens. The company was initially established to transfer Siemens' electrical machinery technology to Japan. Despite its connections to the Furukawa zaibatsu, Fujitsu escaped the Allied occupation of Japan after the Second World War mostly unscathed.

In 1954, Fujitsu manufactured Japan's first computer, the FACOM 100 mainframe, and in 1961 launched its second generation computers (transistorized) the FACOM 222 mainframe. The 1968 FACOM230 "5" Series marked the beginning of its third generation computers. Fujitsu offered mainframe computers from 1955 until at least 2002 Fujitsu's computer products have also included minicomputers, small business computers, servers and personal computers (FM-8, FM-7, FM Towns, etc.).

In 1955, Fujitsu founded Kawasaki Frontale as a company football club; Kawasaki Frontale has been a J. League football club since 1999. In 1967, the company's name was officially changed to the contraction Fujitsū (富士通). Since 1985, the company also fields a company American football team, the Fujitsu Frontiers, who play in the corporate X-League, appeared in 7 Japan X Bowls, winning two, and won two Rice Bowls.

In 1971, Fujitsu signed an OEM agreement with the Canadian company Consolidated Computers Limited (CCL) to distribute CCL's data entry product, Key-Edit. Fujitsu joined both International Computers Limited (ICL) which earlier began marketing Key-Edit in the British Commonwealth of countries as well as in both western and eastern Europe; and CCL's direct marketing staff in Canada, USA, London (UK) and Frankfurt. Mers Kutt, inventor of Key-Edit and founder of CCL, was the common thread that led to Fujitsu's later association with ICL and Gene Amdahl.

In 1986, Fujitsu and The Queen's University of Belfast business incubation unit (QUBIS Ltd) established a joint venture called Kainos, a privately held software company based in Belfast, Northern Ireland.

In 1990, Fujitsu acquired 80% of the UK-based computer company ICL for $1.29 billion. In September 1990, Fujitsu announced the launch of a new series of mainframe computers which were at that time the fastest in the world. In July 1991, Fujitsu acquired more than half of the Russian company KME-CS (Kazan Manufacturing Enterprise of Computer Systems).

In 1992, Fujitsu announced plans to build a joint-venture plant in Punjab, India, to produce telephone switchboards. Fujitsu owned 51 percent of the joint venture, with the remaining 49 percent owned by Punjab's state-run electronics company. Dr. Sushil Kumar Mangal, who was at the time the managing director of the Punjab State Electronics Corporation, was appointed Chairman of Fujitsu India Telecom Ltd. This INR 116-crore project was set up by Fujitsu for the manufacture of Electronic Digital Exchange, with Fujitsu holding a 51 percent stake in the venture. Concurrently, Fujitsu established a new subsidiary, Fujitsu Networks Industry Inc., in Stamford, Connecticut, to develop communications services.

In 1992, Fujitsu also introduced the world's first 21-inch full-color plasma display. It was a hybrid, based upon the plasma display created at the University of Illinois at Urbana-Champaign and NHK STRL, achieving superior brightness.

In 1993, Fujitsu formed a flash memory manufacturing joint venture with AMD, Spansion. As part of the transaction, AMD contributed its flash memory group, Fab 25 in Texas, its R&D facilities and assembly plants in Thailand, Malaysia and China; Fujitsu provided its Flash memory business division and the Malaysian Fujitsu Microelectronics final assembly and test operations.

From February 1989 until mid-1997, Fujitsu built the FM Towns PC variant. It started as a proprietary PC variant intended for multimedia applications and computer games, but later became more compatible with regular PCs. In 1993, the FM Towns Marty was released, a gaming console compatible with the FM Towns games.

Fujitsu agreed to acquire the 58 percent of Amdahl Corporation (including the Canada-based DMR consulting group) that it did not already own for around $850 million in July 1997.

In April 1997, the company acquired a 30 percent stake in GLOVIA International, Inc., an El Segundo, Calif., manufacturing ERP software provider whose software it had begun integrating into its electronics plants starting in 1994.

In June 1999, Fujitsu's historical connection with Siemens was revived, when the two companies agreed to merge their European computer operations into a new 50:50 joint venture called Fujitsu Siemens Computers, which became the world's fifth-largest computer manufacturing company.

=== 2000 to 2024 ===
In April 2000, Fujitsu acquired the remaining 70% of GLOVIA International.

In April 2002 ICL re-branded itself as Fujitsu. On March 2, 2004, Fujitsu Computer Products of America lost a class action lawsuit over MPG series hard disk drives with defective chips and firmware. In October 2004, Fujitsu acquired the Australian subsidiary of Atos Origin, a systems implementation company with around 140 employees which specialized in SAP.

In August 2007, Fujitsu signed a £500 million, 10-year deal with Reuters Group under which Reuters outsourced the majority of its internal IT department to Fujitsu. As part of the agreement around 300 Reuters staff and 200 contractors transferred to Fujitsu. In October 2007, Fujitsu announced that it would be establishing an offshore development centre in Noida, India with a capacity to house 1,200 employees, in an investment of US$10 million.

In October 2007, Fujitsu's Australia and New Zealand subsidiary acquired Infinity Solutions Ltd, a New Zealand–based IT hardware, services and consultancy company, for an undisclosed amount.

In January 2009, Fujitsu reached an agreement to sell its HDD business to Toshiba. Transfer of the business was completed on October 1. 2009.

In March 2009, Fujitsu announced that it had decided to convert FDK Corporation, at that time an equity-method affiliate, to a consolidated subsidiary from May 1, 2009 (tentative schedule) by subscribing to a private placement to increase FDK's capital. On April 1, 2009, Fujitsu agreed to acquire Siemens' stake in Fujitsu Siemens Computers for approximately EUR450m. Fujitsu Siemens Computers was subsequently renamed Fujitsu Technology Solutions.

In April 2009, Fujitsu acquired Australian software company Supply Chain Consulting for a $48 million deal, just weeks after purchasing the Telstra subsidiary Kaz for $200 million.

Concerning of net loss forecast that amounted to 95 billion yen in the year ending March 2013, in February 2013 Fujitsu announced the cutting of 5,000 jobs of which 3,000 jobs in Japan and the rest overseas from its 170,000 employees. Fujitsu also merged its Large-scale integration chip designing business with that of Panasonic Corporation, resulting in the establishment of Socionext.

In 2014, after severe losses, Fujitsu spun off its LSI chip manufacturing division as well, as Mie Fujitsu semiconductor, which was later bought in 2018 by United Semiconductor Japan Co., Ltd., wholly owned by United Microelectronics Corporation.

In 2015, Fujitsu celebrated 80 years since establishment at a time when its IT business embarked upon the Fujitsu 2015 World Tour which has included 15 major cities globally and been visited by over 10,000 IT professionals with Fujitsu presenting its take on the future of Hyper Connectivity and Human Centric Computing.

In April 2015 GLOVIA International is renamed FUJITSU GLOVIA, Inc.

In November 2015, Fujitsu Limited and VMware announced new areas of collaboration to empower customers with flexible and secure cloud technologies. It also acquired USharesoft which provides enterprise-class application delivery software for automating the build, migration and governance of applications in multi-cloud environments.

In January 2016, Fujitsu Network Communications Inc. announced a new suite of layered products to advance software-defined networking (SDN) for carriers, service providers and cloud builders. Virtuora NC, based on open standards, is described by Fujitsu as "a suite of standards-based, multi-layered, multi-vendor network automation and virtualization products" that "has been hands-on hardened by some of the largest global service providers."

In 2019, Fujitsu started to deliver 5G telecommunications equipment to NTT Docomo, along with NEC.

In March 2020, Fujitsu announced the creation of a subsidiary, later named Fujitsu Japan, that will enable the company to expand its business in the Japanese IT services market.

In June 2020, Fugaku, co-developed with the RIKEN research institute, was declared the most powerful supercomputer in the world. The performance capability of Fugaku is 415.53 PFLOPS with a theoretical peak of 513.86 PFLOPS. It is three times faster than of the previous champion. Fugaku also ranked first place in categories that measure computational methods performance for industrial use, artificial intelligence applications, and big data analytics. The supercomputer is located in a facility in Kobe.

In June 2020, Fujitsu developed an artificial intelligence monitor that can recognize complex hand movements, built on its crime surveillance technology. The AI is designed to check whether the subject completes the proper hand washing procedure based on the guidelines issued by the WHO.

In September 2020, Fujitsu introduced software-defined storage technology that incorporates Qumulo hybrid cloud file storage software to enable enterprises to unify petabytes of unstructured data from disparate locations, across multiple data centers and the cloud. This is expected to support various types of storages, including NVMe SSDs, HDDs and flash-drives.

In 2024, Fujitsu relocated its headquarters from Shiodome City Center in Minato, Tokyo, to Kawasaki, Kanagawa. The company relocated its administration department to its Kawasaki plant in Nakahara-ku, its sales department to an office building in Saiwaiku-ku, and its system development department to an office building in Ōta, Tokyo.

=== 2026 to present ===
In July 2026, Fujitsu announced a physical-artificial-intelligence initiative with Nvidia, FANUC, Yaskawa Electric and Kawasaki Heavy Industries. Led by Fujitsu, the initiative began developing a collaborative control platform that integrates Nvidia's physical-AI technologies with industrial robotics systems.

== Operations ==
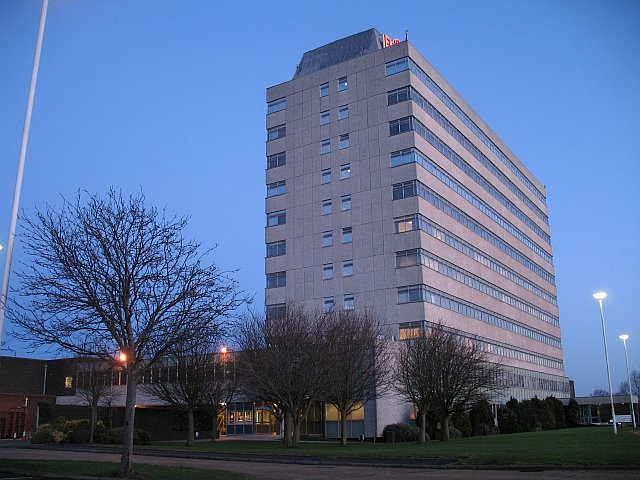
The Fujitsu office in Bracknell, United Kingdom, formerly an ICL site and opened by HM the Queen in 1976

=== Fujitsu Laboratories ===
Fujitsu Laboratories, Fujitsu's Research and Development division, has approximately 900 employees and a capital of JP¥5 billion. The current CEO is Hirotaka Hara.

In 2012, Fujitsu announced that it had developed new technology for non-3D camera phones. The technology will allow the camera phones to take 3D photos.

=== Fujitsu Electronics Europe GmbH ===
Fujitsu Electronics Europe GmbH entered the market as a global distributor on January 1, 2016.

=== Fujitsu Consulting ===
Fujitsu Consulting is the consulting and services arm of the Fujitsu group, providing information technology consulting, implementation and management services.

Fujitsu Consulting was founded in 1973 in Montreal, Quebec, Canada, under its original name "DMR" (an acronym of the three founder's names: Pierre Ducros, Serge Meilleur and Alain Roy) During the next decade, the company established a presence throughout Quebec and Canada, before extending its reach to international markets. For nearly thirty years, DMR Consulting grew to become an international consulting firm, changing its name to Fujitsu Consulting in 2002 after being acquired by Fujitsu Ltd.

Fujitsu operates a division of the company in India, resulting from an acquisition of North America–based company, Rapidigm. It has offshore divisions at Noida, Pune, Hyderabad, Chennai and Bangalore with Pune being the head office. Fujitsu Consulting India launched its second $10 million development center at Noida in October 2007, a year after starting operation in the country. Following the expansion plan, Fujitsu Consulting India launched the fourth development center in Bengaluru in Nov 2011.

=== Fujitsu General ===
General brand logo

Fujitsu Ltd. had a 42% shareholding in Fujitsu General, which manufactures and markets various air conditioning units and humidity control solutions under the General and Fujitsu brands.

Fujitsu General made CRT and plasma televisions, but exited that business in 2007.

In India, the company ended its long-standing joint venture agreement with the Dubai-based ETA group in 2020.

In January 2025, Fujitsu announced it was selling the air conditioner business to Japanese company Paloma Industries, the owner of Rheem Manufacturing Company. The branding will transition from "Fujitsu General" to simply "General".

=== PFU Limited ===
PFU Limited, headquartered in Ishikawa, Japan is a wholly owned subsidiary of Fujitsu Limited. PFU Limited was established in 1960, has approximately 4,600 employees globally and in 2013 turned over 126.4 billion Yen (US$1.2 Billion). PFU manufactures interactive kiosks, keyboards, network security hardware, embedded computers and imaging products (document scanners) all under the PFU or Fujitsu brand. In addition to hardware PFU also produce desktop and enterprise document capture software and document management software products. PFU has overseas Sales & Marketing offices in Germany (PFU Imaging Solutions Europe Limited), Italy (PFU Imaging Solutions Europe Limited), United Kingdom (PFU Imaging Solutions Europe Limited) and United States of America (Fujitsu Computer Products of America Inc). PFU Limited are responsible for the design, development, manufacture, sales and support of document scanners which are sold under the Fujitsu brand. Fujitsu are market leaders in professional document scanners with its fi-series, Scansnap and ScanPartner product families as well as Paperstream IP, Paperstream Capture, ScanSnap Manager, ScanSnap Home, Cardminder, Magic Desktop and Rack2Filer software products. In 2022 Ricoh bought 80% of PFU Limited. As a result several scanner series will be rebranded from Fujitsu to Ricoh, although they will continue to be made in the same facilities.

=== Fujitsu Glovia, Inc. ===
Fujitsu Glovia, a wholly owned subsidiary of Fujitsu Ltd., is a discrete manufacturing enterprise resource planning software vendor based in El Segundo, California, with international operations in the Netherlands, Japan and the United Kingdom. The company offers on-premise and cloud-based ERP manufacturing software under the Glovia G2 brand, and software as a service (SaaS) under the brand Glovia OM. The company was established in 1970 as Xerox Computer Services, where it developed inventory, manufacturing and financial applications. Fujitsu acquired 30 percent of the renamed Glovia International in 1997 and the remaining 70 percent stake in 2000.

=== Fujitsu Client Computing Limited ===
Fujitsu Client Computing Limited (FCCL), headquartered in Kawasaki, Kanagawa, the city where the company was founded, is the division of Fujitsu responsible for research, development, design, manufacturing and sales of consumer PC products. Formerly a wholly owned subsidiary, in November 2017, FCCL was spun off into a joint venture with Lenovo and Development Bank of Japan (DBJ). The new company retains the same name, and Fujitsu is still responsible for sales and support of the products; however, Lenovo owns a majority stake at 51%, while Fujitsu retains 44%. The remaining 5% stake is held by DBJ.

=== Fujitsu Network Communications, Inc. ===
Fujitsu Network Communications, Inc., headquartered in Richardson, Texas, United States, is a wholly owned subsidiary of Fujitsu Limited. Established in 1996, Fujitsu Network Communications specializes in building, operating, and supporting optical and wireless broadband and telecommunications networks. The company's customers include telecommunications service providers, internet service providers, cable companies, utilities, and municipalities. Fujitsu Network Communications provides network management and design tools. The company also builds networks that comply with various next-generation technologies and initiatives, including the Telecom Infra Project.

== Products and services ==
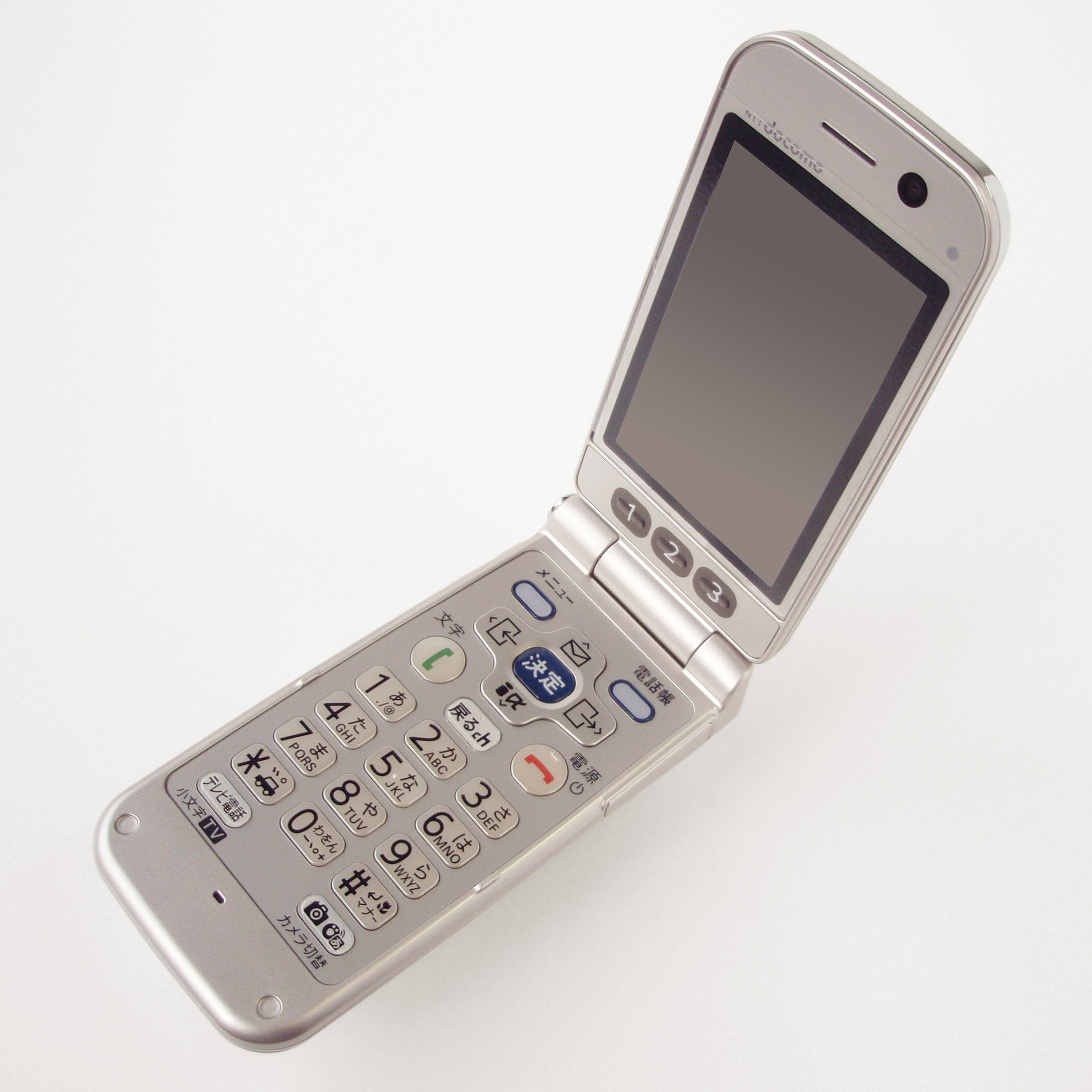
An NTT DoCoMo F-10A mobile phone produced by Fujitsu

=== Computing products ===
Fujitsu's computing product lines include:

- Relational Database: Fujitsu Enterprise Postgres

Fujitsu has more than 35 years experience in database development and is a “major contributor” to open source Postgres. Fujitsu engineers have also developed an Enterprise Postgres version called Fujitsu Enterprise Postgres. Fujitsu Enterprise Postgres benefits include Enterprise Support; warranted code; High Availability enhancements; security enhancements (end to end transparent data encryption, data masking, auditing); Performance enhancements (In-Memory Columnar Index provides support for HTAP (Hybrid transactional/analytical processing) workloads); High-speed Backup and Recovery; High-speed data load; Global metacache (improved memory management); Oracle compatibility extensions (to assist migration from Oracle to Postgres). Fujitsu Enterprise Postgres can be deployed on X86 (Linux, Windows), IBM z/IBM LinuxONE; it is also packaged as a RedHat OpenShift (OCP) container.

- PRIMERGY

In May 2011, Fujitsu decided to enter the mobile phone space again, with Microsoft announcing plans that Fujitsu would release Windows Phone devices.

- ETERNUS

Fujitsu PRIMERGY and ETERNUS are distributed by TriTech Distribution Limited in Hong Kong.

LIFEBOOK, AMILO: Fujitsu's range of notebook computers and tablet PCs.

=== Cloud computing ===
Fujitsu offers a public cloud service delivered from data centers in Japan, Australia, Singapore, the United States, the United Kingdom and Germany based on its Global Cloud Platform strategy announced in 2010. The platform delivers Infrastructure-as-a-Service (IaaS) – virtual information and communication technology (ICT) infrastructure, such as servers and storage functionality – from Fujitsu's data centers. In Japan, the service was offered as the On-Demand Virtual System Service (OViSS) and was then launched globally as Fujitsu Global Cloud Platform/S5 (FGCP/S5). Since July 2013 the service has been called IaaS Trusted Public S5. Globally, the service is operated from Fujitsu data centers located in Australia, Singapore, the United States, the United Kingdom, Germany and Japan.

Fujitsu has also launched a Windows Azure powered Global Cloud Platform in a partnership with Microsoft. This offering, delivering Platform-as-a-Service (PaaS), was known as FGCP/A5 in Japan but has since been renamed FUJITSU Cloud PaaS A5 for Windows Azure. It is operated from a Fujitsu data center in Japan. It offers a set of application development frameworks, such as Microsoft .NET, Java and PHP, and data storage capabilities consistent with the Windows Azure platform provided by Microsoft. The basic service consists of compute, storage, Microsoft SQL Azure, and Windows Azure AppFabric technologies such as Service Bus and Access Control Service, with options for inter-operating services covering implementation and migration of applications, system building, systems operation, and support.

Fujitsu acquired RunMyProcess in April 2013, a Cloud-based integration Platform-as-a-Service (PaaS) specialized in workflow automation and business application development.

Fujitsu offers local cloud platforms, such as in Australia, that provide the ability to rely on its domestic data centers which keep sensitive financial data under local jurisdiction and compliance standards.

=== Microprocessors ===
Fujitsu at one time produced the SPARC-compliant CPU (SPARClite), the "Venus" 128 GFLOP SPARC64 VIIIfx model was included in the K computer, the world's fastest supercomputer in June 2011 with a rating of over 8 petaflops, and in October 2011, K became the first computer to top 10 petaflops.

The Fujitsu FR, FR-V and ARM architecture microprocessors are widely used, additionally in ASICs and Application-specific standard products (ASSP) like the Milbeaut with customer variants named Nikon Expeed. They were acquired by Spansion in 2013.

== Advertising ==
The old slogan "The possibilities are infinite" can be found below the company's logo on major advertisements and ties in with the small logo above the letters J and I of the word Fujitsu. This smaller logo represents the symbol for infinity. As of April 2010, Fujitsu is in the process of rolling out a new slogan focused on entering into partnerships with its customers and retiring the "possibilities are infinite" tagline. The new slogan is "shaping tomorrow with you".

== Horizon scandal ==
Fujitsu designed, developed and operated the Horizon IT system which was at the centre of the legal dispute between the UK Post Office and its sub-postmasters. The case, still unsettled, found that the IT system was unreliable and that faults in the system caused discrepancies in branch accounts which were not the responsibility of the postmasters themselves. Mr Justice Fraser, the judge hearing the case, noted that Fujitsu had given "wholly unsatisfactory evidence" and there had been a "lack of accuracy on the part of Fujitsu witnesses in their evidence". Following his concerns, Fraser sent a file to the Director of Public Prosecutions.

Fujitsu was also found to have pressured the UK government to sign off the controversial and faulty IT system that, as a result of its faulty operation, resulted in numerous UK postmasters and sub-postmasters being accused falsely, and subsequently convicted of theft, false accounting and fraud, with consequences including imprisonment and monetary reparations. Of the hundreds of people affected, as of January 2024 only around 1 in 9 of those convicted have had their convictions overturned, whereas others have died due to the length of time that has elapsed, or have taken their own lives in the wake of their wrongful convictions. Although there has been some media coverage of organised legal appeals by groups of those affected, the matter has recently gained enhanced attention by mainstream media and the wider public as a whole, and is currently being acted upon by authorities in an attempt to accelerate and automate the clearing of the names of all those wrongly convicted, who until now were required to launch their own legal appeals to have their names cleared.

== Environmental record ==
Fujitsu reports that all its notebook and tablet PCs released globally comply with the latest Energy Star standard.

Greenpeace's Cool IT Leaderboard of April 2013 "examines how IT companies use their considerable influence to change government policies that will drive clean energy deployment" and ranks Fujitsu 4th out of 21 leading manufacturers, on the strength of "developed case study data of its solutions with fairly transparent methodology, and is the leading company in terms of establishing ambitious and detailed goals for future carbon savings from its IT solutions."

== See also ==
- List of computer system manufacturers
- List of semiconductor fabrication plants
- See the World by Train, a daily Japanese TV mini-programme sponsored by Fujitsu since 1987
