= OFS (company) =

American technology company

- Industry: Fiber Optics development
- Founded: 2001
- Headquarters: Norcross, Georgia, United States.
- Key people: Dr. Timothy F. Murray, CEO and Chairman
- Parent: Furukawa Electric
- Website: www.ofsoptics.com

OFS is an American technology company known for designing and manufacturing fiber optic solutions. Since the mid-2010s, the company's headquarters in Norcross, Georgia was used as a film studio.

== History ==
OFS is part of Furukawa Electric Company that has been in operation since 1884. In 2001, Lucent Technologies' Optical Fiber Solutions business was sold to Furukawa Electric Co. Ltd. The new company became OFS Fitel, LLC, headquartered in Norcross (near Atlanta), Georgia, USA.

In 2010, OFS and Jiangsu Hengtong Optic-Electric Co., Ltd. established a joint venture company in China. This led to the formation of Jiangsu OFS Hengtong Optical Technology Co., Ltd.

In 2018, OFS sold 103 acres of its property to Gwinnett County commissioners. Per its agreement, the commissioners allowed the company to stay in its space until 2024.

== Products and services ==
OFS designs and manufactures optical fiber, fiber optic cable, and other fiber optic solutions for various industries.

== Awards ==
- 2016 - Emmy Award from the National Academy of Television Arts and Sciences for contributions toward the pioneering and deployment of fiber optic cable.
- 2016 - Silver award from the 2016 Cabling Installation and Maintenance Innovators Awards Program
- 2019 - ICT Woman of the Year from the BICSI for recognition of an exceptional woman in the information and communications technology (ICT) industry who has significantly impacted the growth and advancement of women in the industry.

== Film productions ==
The site was used for a variety of film productions since the mid-2010s as part of the film industry in Georgia. These productions include Black Panther, Baby Driver, and Bad Boys for Life. Furthermore, the Georgia Film Academy hosts their classes in the facility. Since 2013, there were plans by Jacoby Development Inc. to reconstruct the OFS headquarters into a full-fledged film studio. However, due to a series of lawsuits with OFS, chairman Jim Jacoby could only lease the buildings on the property. As of 2021, is the second-largest production facility in Georgia behind Trilith Studios in Fayetteville.

=== Films ===
- The Hunger Games: Mockingjay - Part 1 (2014)
- The Hunger Games: Mockingjay - Part 2 (2015)
- Furious 7 (2015)
- Hidden Figures (2016)
- Baby Driver (2017)
- Black Panther (2018)
- The Front Runner (2018)
- Superfly
- Avengers: Endgame (2019)
- Godzilla: King of the Monsters (2019)
- Bad Boys for Life (2020)
- Holidate (2020)
- Blue Bayou (2021)
- Black Panther: Wakanda Forever (2022)
- Day Shift (2022)
- The Man from Toronto (2022)
- Samaritan (2022)
- Superintelligence (2022)

==== Television series ====
- Black Lightning (2018-2021)
- The Resident (2018-present)
- Miracle Workers (2019-present)
- The Outsider (2020)

== See also ==
- Furukawa Electric
- Hengtong
- Optical fiber
