= Primergy =

PRIMERGY is Fujitsu's brand name for x86-architecture designed servers. The brand name PRIMERGY represents a range of servers from single-socket over dual-socket to quad-socket systems. Eight socket systems are branded differently with "PRIMEQUEST", whereas Fujitsu servers in the UNIX/Mainframe world, also known as SPARC systems, are named "Fujitsu M10" and mainframes "BS2000."

== History ==
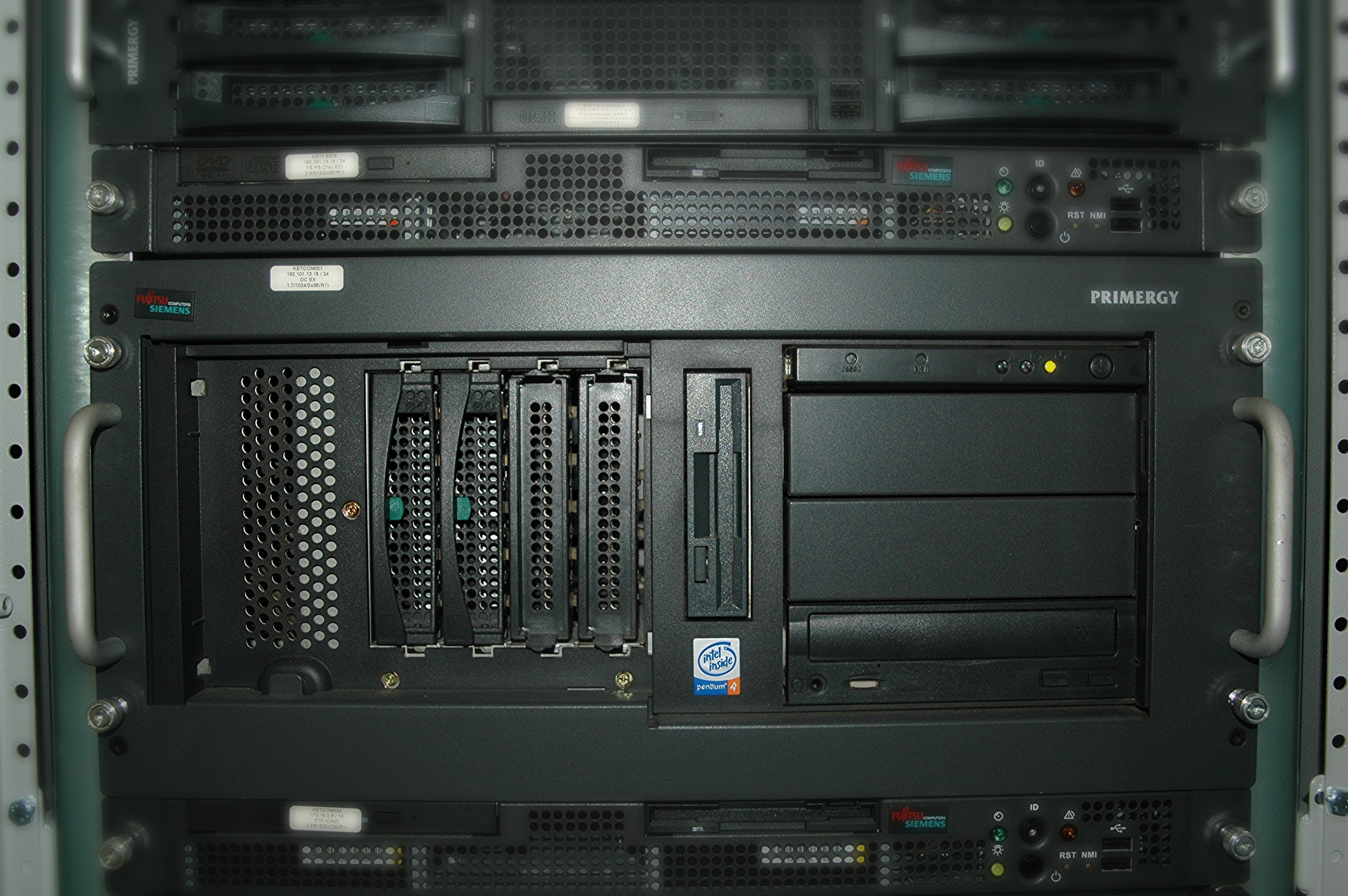
Older Fujitsu Siemens PRIMERGY line of x86 servers

The brand PRIMERGY was initially made in 1994 by Siemens Nixdorf Computers. Due to certain acquisitions and takeovers, PRIMERGY survived the time of the joint-venture between Fujitsu and Siemens, who became Fujitsu Siemens Computers, until today.

== Current portfolio ==
Fujitsu Server PRIMERGY are available in different form factors and height units.

=== Naming scheme ===
All PRIMERGY servers follow a dedicated naming scheme. First, the name delivers information about the form factor of the system, secondly the number of sockets is given, thirdly, it incorporates the used processor family (currently only Intel processors), and then a number for the feature-set of the system and lastly, the appendix gives insight about the system generation according to the Intel Xeon processor family generation development.

=== TX - tower servers ===
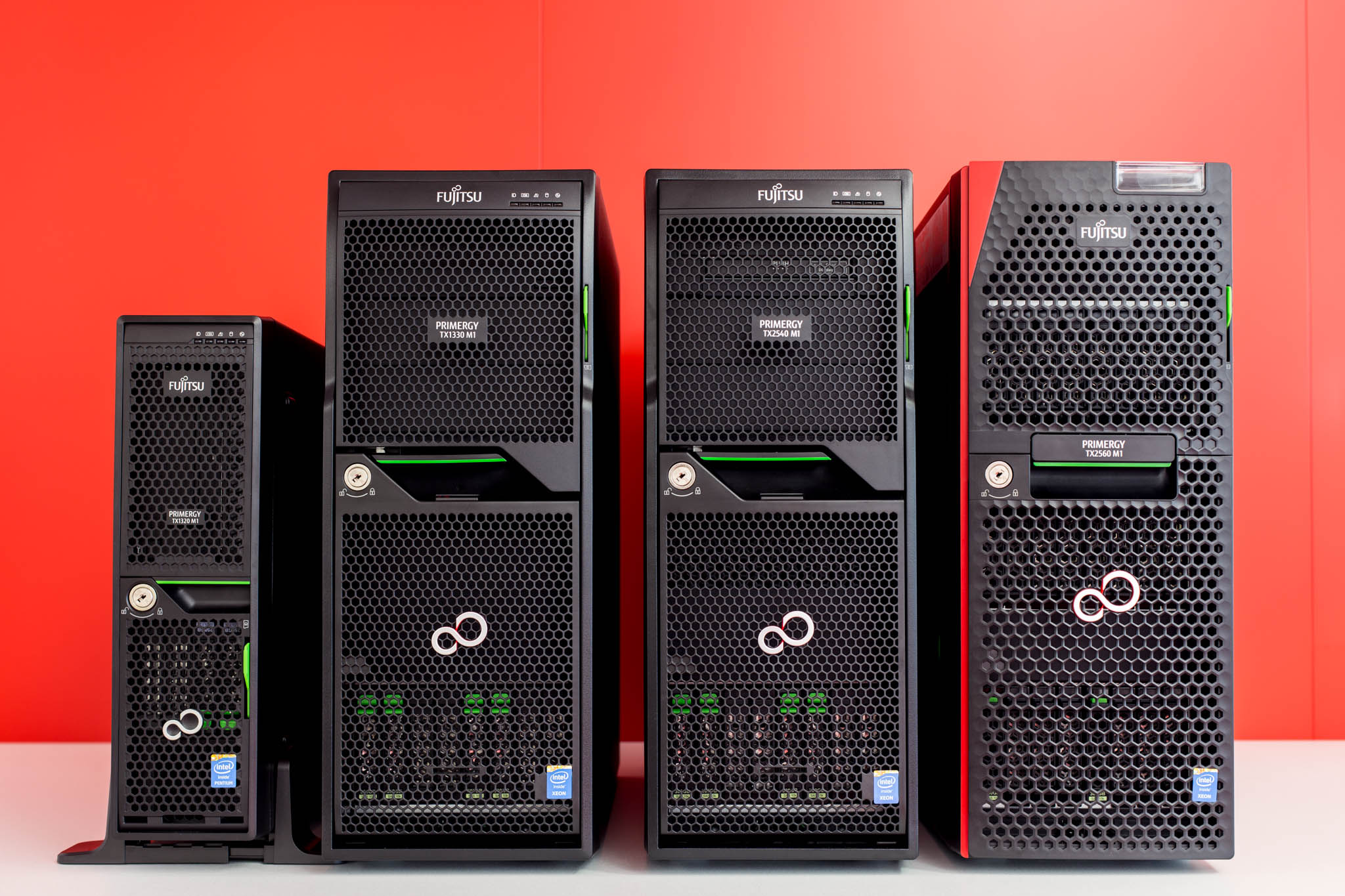
Different form factors of Fujitsu PRIMERGY Tower Server

The abbreviation TX stands for tower servers. The current portfolio of PRIMERGY TX consists of the following:

- TX1310 M1
- TX1320 M2
- TX1330 M2
- TX150 S8 (old naming)
- TX2540 M1
- TX2560 M2

=== RX - rack servers ===
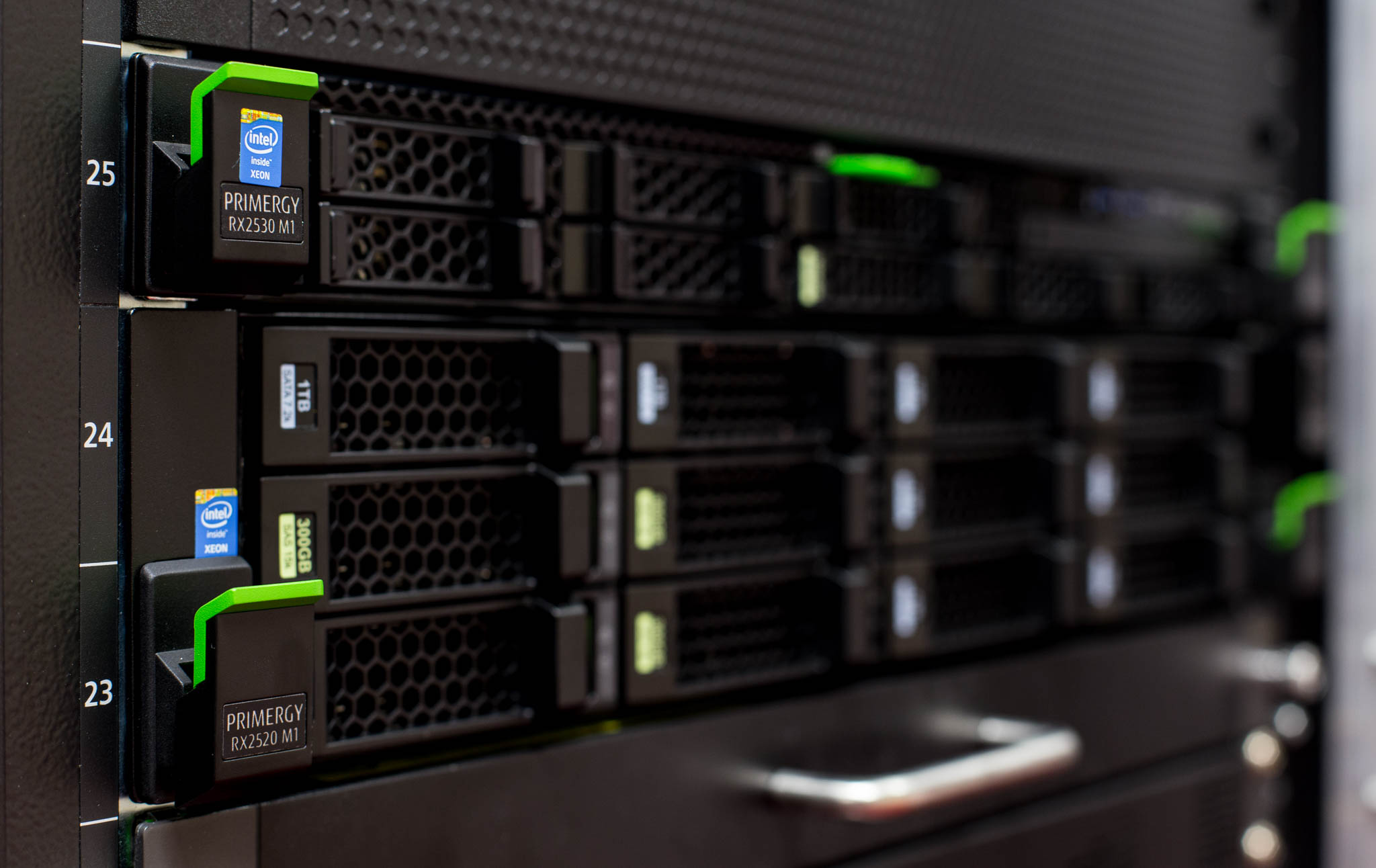
1U and 2U rack servers

The abbreviation RX stands for rack servers. The current portfolio of PRIMERGY RX consists of the following:

- RX1330 M2
- RX2510 M2
- RX2520 M1
- RX2530 M2
- RX2540 M2
- RX2560 M2
- RX4770 M2

=== BX - blade servers ===
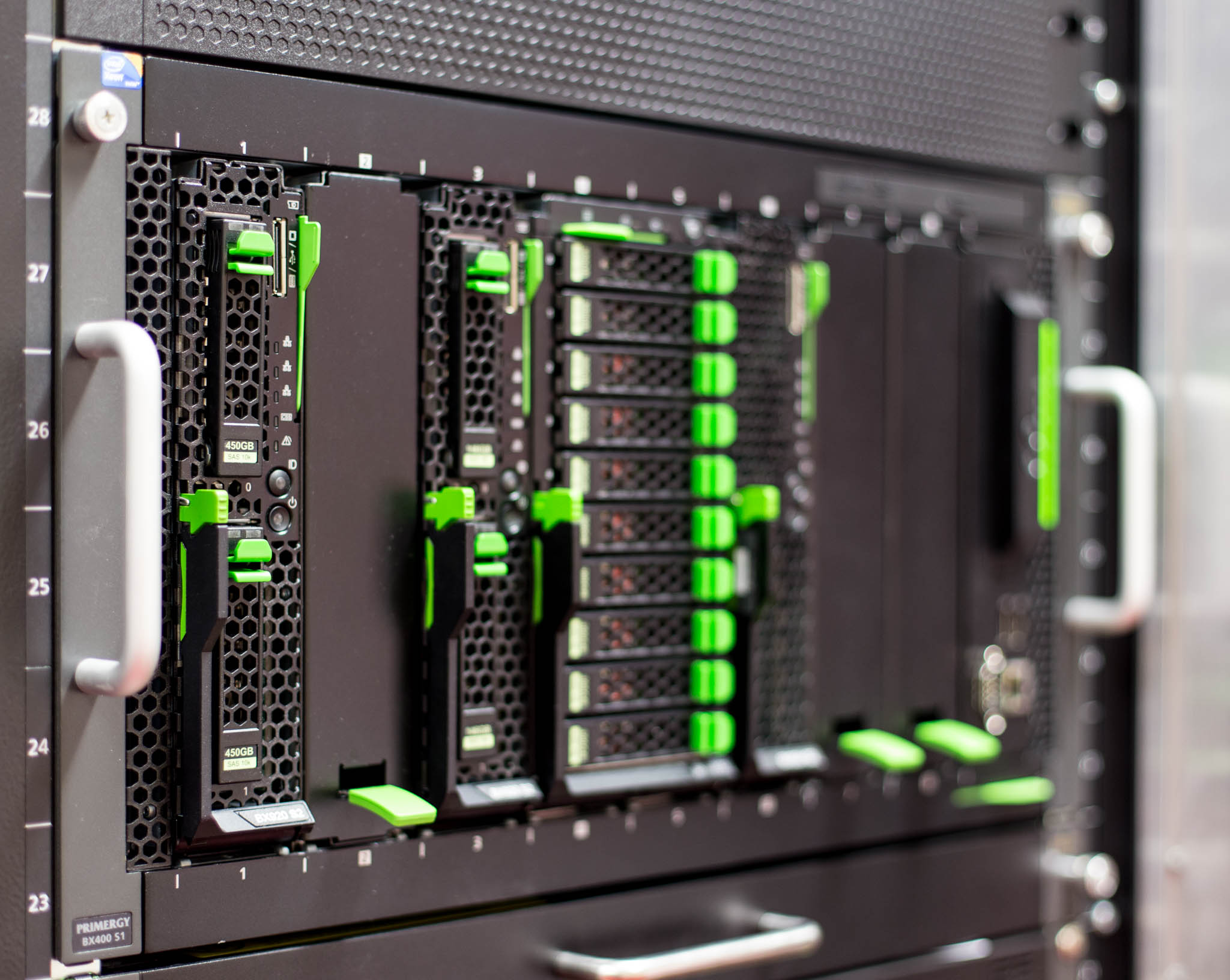
Rack mounted blade server chassis PRIMERGY BX400

The abbreviation BX stands for blade servers. The current portfolio of PRIMERGY BX consists of the following:

- Blade Chassis
- BX400 S1
- BX600 S1
- BX600 S2
- BX600 S3
- BX900 S2

Server Blades

- BX2560 M2
- BX2580 M2

Storage Blades

- SX910 S1
- SX940 S1
- SX960 S1
- SX980 S2

=== CX - scale-out servers ===
The abbreviation CX stands for scale-out or cloud Servers. The current portfolio of PRIMERGY CX consists of the following:

Chassis

- CX400 M1
- CX400 S2
- CX420 S1

Server Nodes

- CX2550 M2
- CX2570 M2
- CX250 S2
- CX270 S2
- CX272 S1

=== Family features ===
Some features in PRIMERGY servers are available in all systems.

==== Cool-safe Advanced Thermal Design ====
Cool-safe Advanced Thermal Design is Fujitsu's brand name for systems that can operate in higher ambient temperatures. The extended temperature range is from 5 °C to 40 °C, allowing the raising of temperature in a data center and thus saving on cooling costs.

==== ServerView Suite ====
ServerView Suite is the administration software which is used to manage Fujitsu's PRIMERGY and PRIMEQUEST servers or to integrate these servers in enterprise management solutions like Microsoft System Center, VMware vSphere and Nagios Core. To monitor other vendors' systems in ServerView their Management Information Base (MIB) can be integrated.

== PRIMEQUEST - differentiation ==
PRIMEQUEST is the brand-name for business and mission-critical servers. FUJITSU Server PRIMEQUEST is also an x86 architecture designed server, but with extended RAS-features.

== PRIMEFLEX ==
PRIMEFLEX is a combination of hardware, software and service that are "pre-defined, pre-integrated and pre-tested".

== See also ==
- List of computer manufacturers
- List of Fujitsu products
- IPMI
- x86
- Server (Computing)
- Intel Xeon processor family
