= Furukawa Ichibei =

Japanese businessman

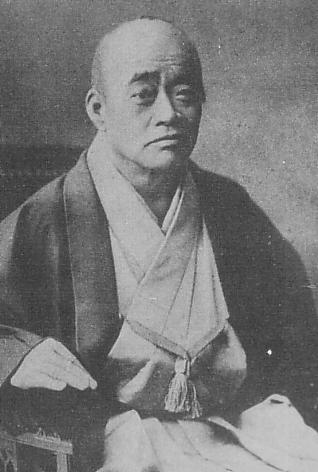
- Furukawa Ichibei, "The Copper King of Japan"
- Born: April 16, 1832
- Died: April 5, 1903 (aged 70)
- Other names: 古河 市兵衛
- Occupation: Industrialist
- Known for: Furukawa zaibatzu

Furukawa Ichibei (古河 市兵衛; April 16, 1832 - April 5, 1903) was a Japanese businessman who founded one of the fifteen largest industrial conglomerates in Japan, specializing in electrical goods, chemicals and metals. He bought the Ashio copper mine from the Japanese government in 1877, which he later organized, with his other holdings, into an industrial conglomerate called the Furukawa zaibatsu, one of the most important in Japan. Japanese companies today with the names "Furukawa" and "Fuji", often belong to this group.

== Biography ==
Furukawa's school education began and ended before Commodore Perry's ships entered Japanese waters. His parents were lower middle-class and could not afford to give him a higher education. It was about the time of the treaty that opened Japan to commerce with the United States and other civilized nations, that the strong traits manifested by the boy attracted the attention of a business man in his native town. He was adopted by an eccentric man named Furukawa Tarozaemon, who gave his adopted son some schooling in business. The stepfather and son had frequent but respectful differences of opinion, but in time the father realized that Furukawa was usually right and in time gave him free rein – a Japanese instance of fortiter in re, suaviter in modo.

=== Commerce and foreign trade ===
Furukawa made large profits in the raw silk trade, exporting his stock for foreign consumption. He also did well in the rice trade, while suffering severe losses at times - an early example of the vicissitudes of commodities trading.

=== Industry ===
In spite of his successes in commerce, Furukawa felt the need to be directly involved with the working man. He yearned to be a captain of industry, desirous of expanding employment opportunities for his compatriots, as unemployment was a serious problem in Japan. He had aspirations similar to a few pioneering industrialists in the West who wished to improve the lot of the working man and to expand the demand for his services. He also had benevolent ideas on raising the standard of living for the working classes, espousing methods of making provision for old age, and suitable foundations to help toward that end.

The opportunity to fulfill his dream came about as the result of the failure of a Japanese firm, which has considerable consequence in the business of the empire. Furukawa had reflected upon the opportunities in mining. He bought out a failing copper mine and as he found mining to his liking, he bought another after a while. This second mine was old and had been worked for decades. It had always produced fairly, but was thought to be pretty well spent. Furukawa's purchase was laughed at by a few of the initiated and not even his own miners encouraged him in the venture. As operations in the mine improved under his ownership and management, it turned out to be one of the greatest mines of Japan, the now-famous Ashio Copper Mine. His management of the Ashio Copper Mine caused a major pollution disaster that rendered large swaths of farmland downstream of the Copper Mine unusable and resulted in major health damage of the people that lived in the affected area. In addition to this workers of the mine rioted in 1907 due to the low wages, initiating the 1907 Ashio Riot that resulted in them receiving higher wages and triggered other strikes and riots in similar industries.

==== Copper ====
At greater depths, he found huge deposits of ore and production increased immensely. He used the great wealth he accumulated to establish his ideal industrial city in the mountains of Ashio. He built better homes for the miners, he installed schools for the young, he endowed hospitals, he built roads throughout the district, he provided instructive amusements for the working men, which was an unheard of thing in Japan at the time.

He lived among the miners so far as the outside demands of his business would permit; when away from them he was nothing more than a plain citizen of Tokyo. All the while he was extending his operations. He bought ten more mines of coal and of copper, in different districts of Japan.

So huge was his wealth and influence that superstitious people began to believe that he might be a demon and that all his beneficence was simply a ploy to gain control over them. This was especially so among neighbouring communities who did not benefit directly from the wealth of the mines, in spite of the fact that the wealth of the whole region and nation benefited from it. When the enormous pollution from the mines began to affect the health of the inhabitants of the region, they felt that their suspicions were confirmed. After riots ensued, the government stepped in and demanded a remedy. In response, Furukawa built a system of tunnels and canals to carry the industrial waste to a remote coast. The cost was great, but the work was completed under his own supervision in a short time. It was a triumph for the government and the people took it as an evidence that even the devil himself was no match for the imperial power of the Emperor.

=== Later life ===
Although Furukawa might be seen as patriarchal in his ideas, and his scheme of government as monarchal, his influence remains, and he is remembered in Japan as the highest example of a far-sighted, public-spirited man, who accomplished great things, and deserved his title of the "Copper King."

In his seventy-second year, the year prior to his death, he went to Korea to open a gold mine. He also had in mind great plans to open mines in China, cut short by his death. His great wealth and ripe old age, did not cause him to slow down. He refused to listen to the remonstrances of his friends and relatives, and remained busy, and with his usual amazing success, until the end.

He first introduced machinery in the sericulture of Japan, thereby extending the production of silk. He preceded all others in the use of electric lights and power in his coal mines and he established the first coke ovens in Japan. He eagerly adopted all modern improvements, and was a good customer for American inventors and manufacturers.
