= Fujitsu Lifebook =

Japanese laptop computer line

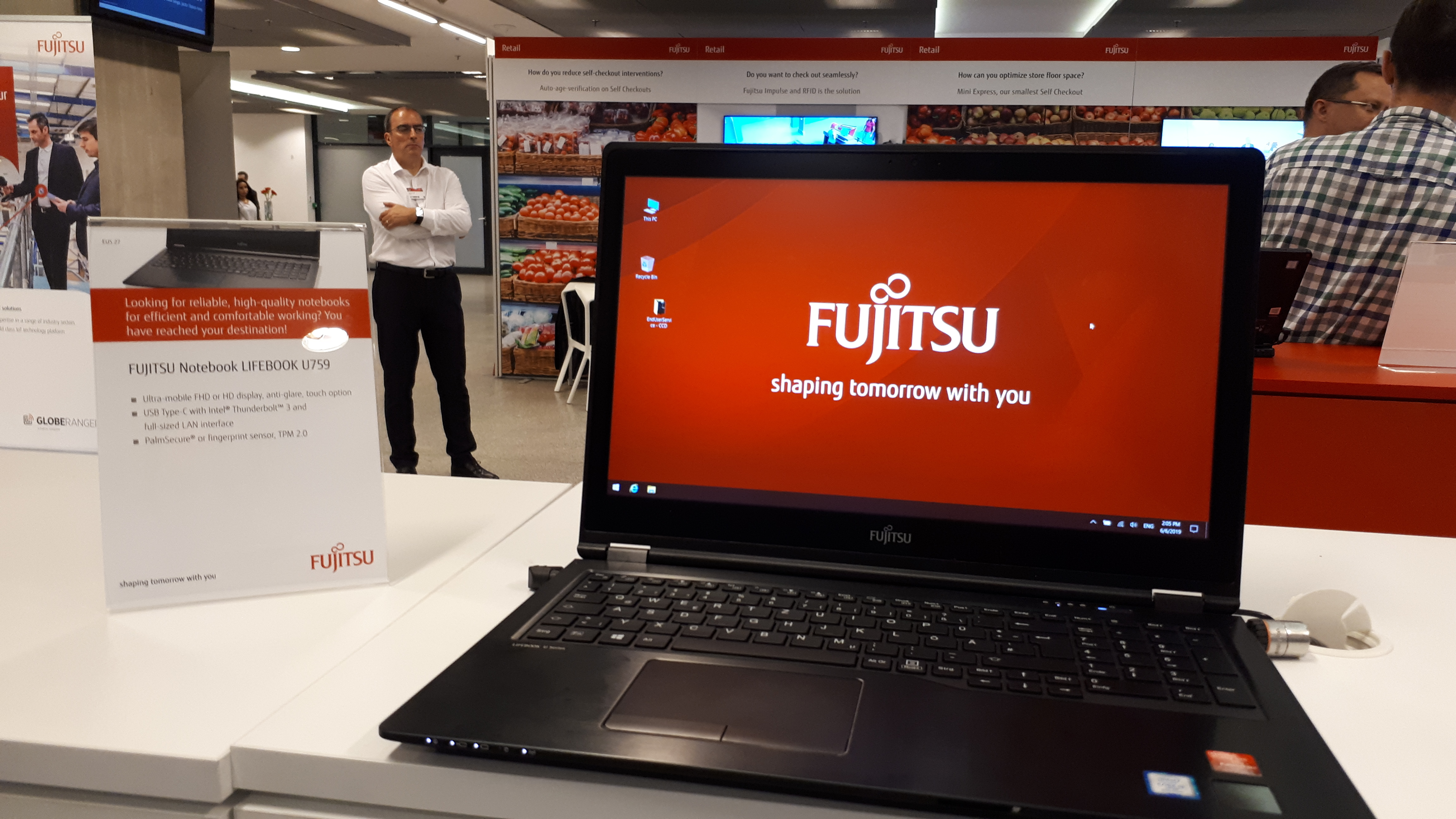
Lifebook U759

Lifebook is a line of business-oriented laptop computers made by Fujitsu, which also offers a range of notebooks and tablet PCs within the same Lifebook family.

== History ==
In partnership with Poqet Computer Corporation, Fujitsu launched the world's first hand-held, one-pound, IBM PC/XT-compatible computer in 1989. It launched its first single-spindle convertible Tablet PC, the Lifebook T3000 Series, in 2003; the T3010 was a launching pad for its current tablet PCs.

== Models ==
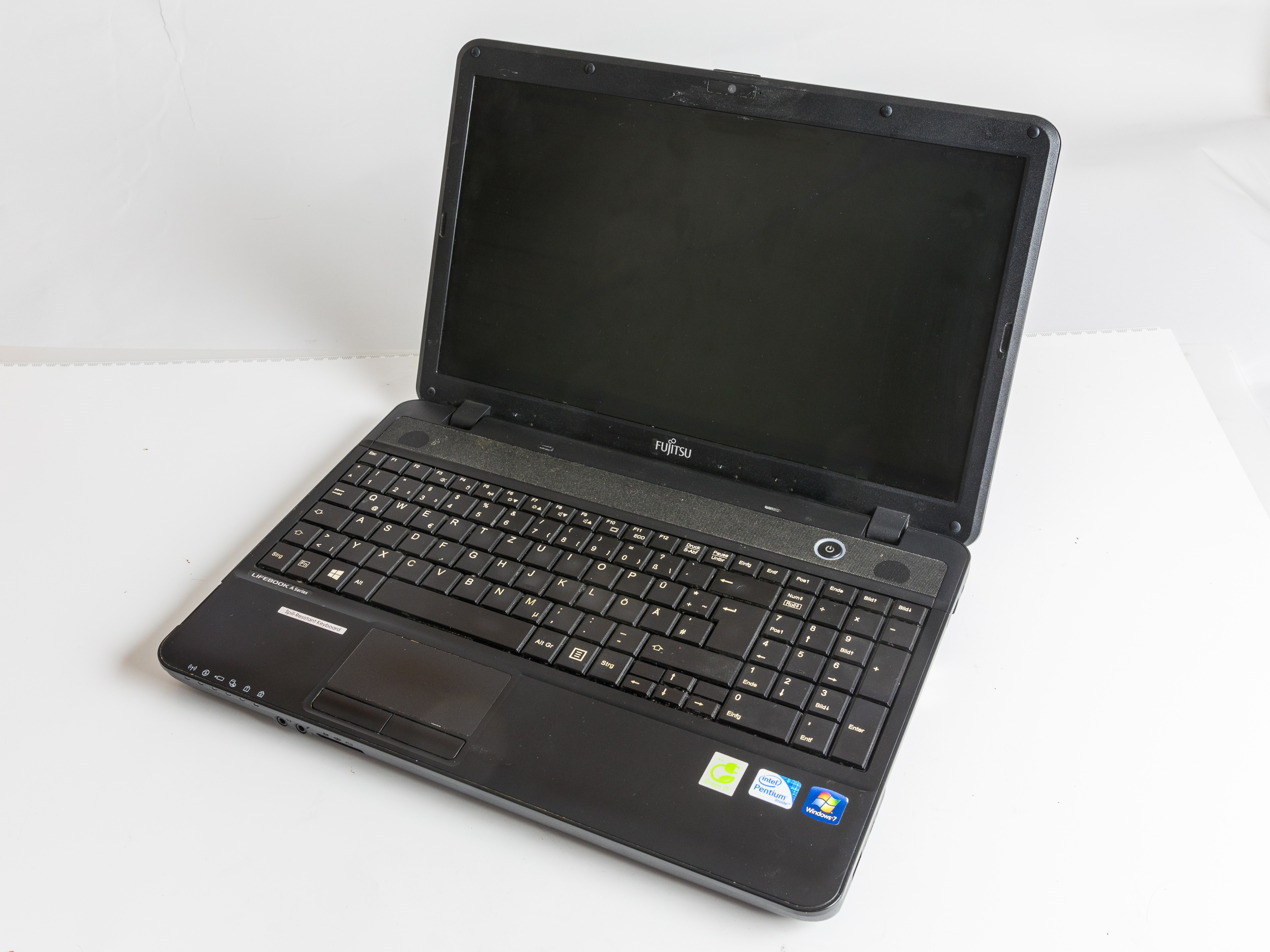
Fujitsu Lifebook AH502

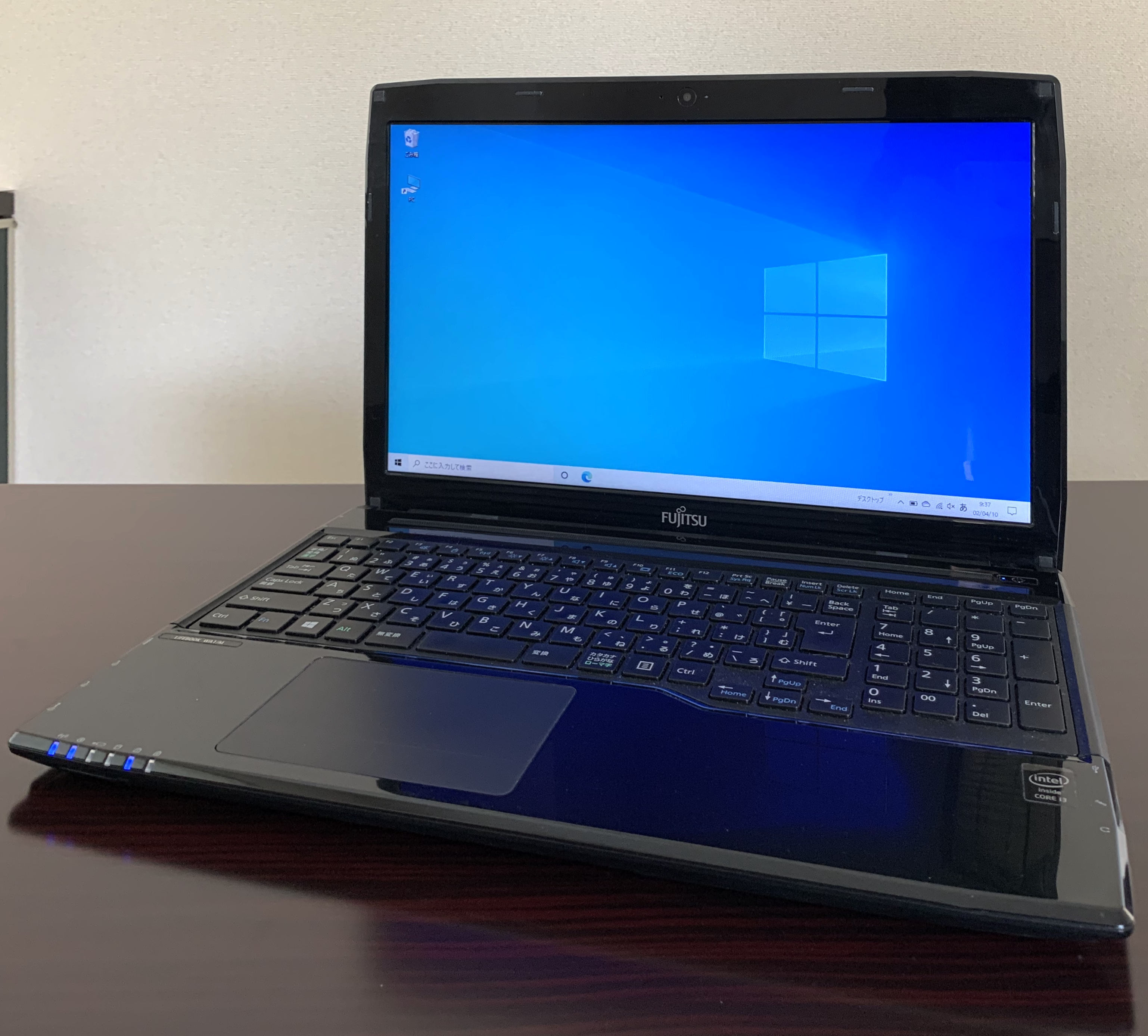
LIFEBOOK WA1/M (JPN)

All series, including former series, are listed here; currently (2017) the Lifebook A series is being continued more for the cheaper private sector and the series E, P, S, T, U mostly more for the business sector. Fujitsu is traditionally strong in the touch screen and tablet area (in the Lifebook S, T, and U series). In addition, reference is also made to the Stylistic series.

=== Lifebook A ===
The A Series was launched in 2010 and initially consisted of the "all-round" models A530, AH530, AH531 and AH550, which are offered in different variants. Similarities were displays with 39.6 cm (15.6 inches) diagonal, false LED backlighting and 1366 × 768 pixels (16:9 aspect ratio, with or without anti-glare protection), as well as the built-in Intel HM55 chipset and keyboards with a numeric keypad. The devices are mainly equipped with mobile processors from the Intel Core i series offered. Even in 2017, the A series, for example with the models A555 and A557, were relatively inexpensive larger laptops (15.6 inches) that were offered as "all-rounders" or as private laptops.

=== Lifebook B ===
The B series was the Biblo class for subnotebooks. The first models (B110 and B112, 1998) were very compact (DIN A5 size and 1.1 kg) and had an 8.4" color display. The special thing about the larger (DIN A4 format) successor models B213x (1999) was the touch-sensitive 10.4" TFT screen and the input pen. The B series is no longer built and has been replaced by the T series or P series.

=== Lifebook C ===
Until 01/2008, the C series was the entry-level series for professional users. It had a simple and robust design, but some additional options such as 3D graphics cards were not available, and on the outside it hardly differed from the E series.

=== Lifebook E ===
The E Series is a line of desktop replacement notebooks. They are particularly robust and usually have more powerful components than the C series (faster processors, more RAM, etc.), which is also reflected in the price. The E series usually has a high-quality, high-contrast 15/15.4-inch screen that is specially designed for office use, since no reflective displays are used and 4:3 formats are mostly available.

=== Lifebook NH ===
46.7 cm screen width. multimedia and gaming.

=== Lifebook P ===
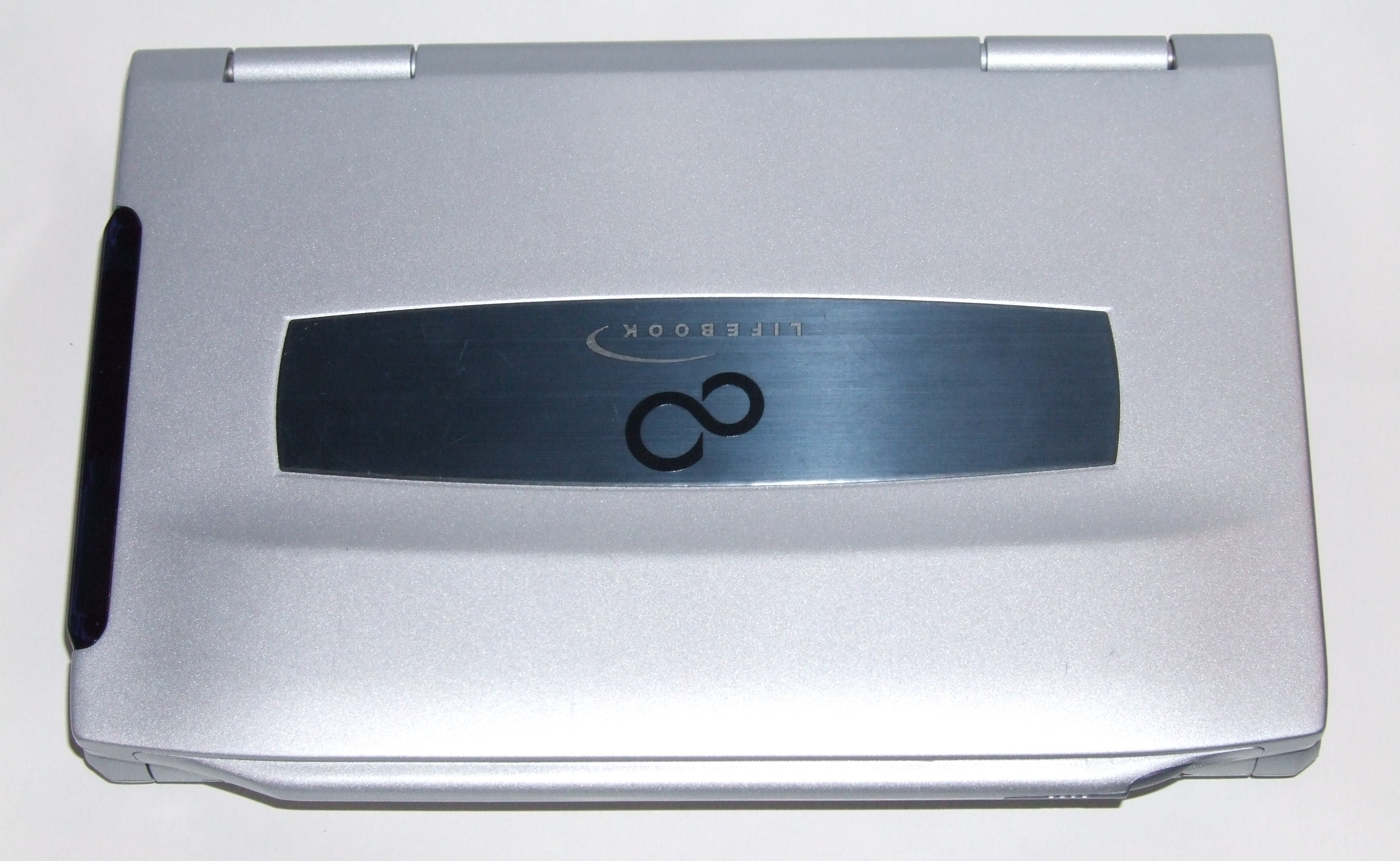
Fujitsu Lifebook P-1032

Several ultraportable notebooks are available under the P-series . This includes e.g. B. the P1620 (2008), which is one of the lightest convertible tablet PC with a weight of 1 kg . The P stands for piccolo .

=== Lifebook Q ===
The Q series are lifestyle notebooks that stand out from the other series with their piano finish and ergonomic covers in stainless steel design and are intended to appeal to a demanding group of buyers. This series is particularly optimized for mobile operation, which is why only ultra-low-voltage processors from the Intel Core architecture are used, the main memory is soldered and two batteries with a runtime of more than 10 hours can be used.

=== Lifebook S ===
The S Series is a line of notebooks originally intended for frequent travelers. The performance is roughly comparable to the E series, but the construction is a bit lighter and the notebooks are smaller due to 14/13 inch displays.

=== Lifebook T ===
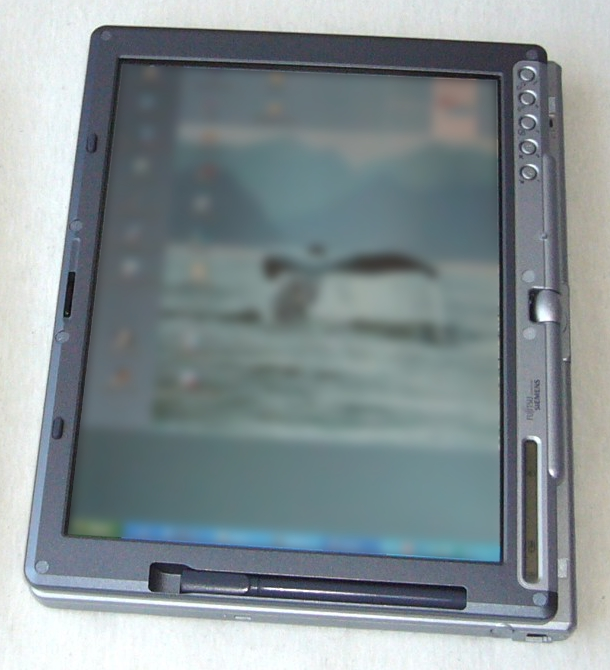
Lifebook T3010

The T series consists of convertible tablet PCs. By rotating the screen, they transform into a "tablet". The T here stands for tablet. The T-Series was introduced in September 2003 with the T3010, which was FTS' most powerful tablet PC and first ever convertible at launch. Although FTS had been building computers that could be operated with a pen ( stylistic ) for a long time, these were only suitable for pen input without any additional devices (cf. slate tablet PCs).

Released in June 2006, the T4210 was the first tablet PC to feature an Intel Core Duo processor. The Toshiba Tecra M7 was launched about a month later. The LIFEBOOK T4215 was the first convertible tablet PC with embedded UMTS. Currently (2017) the T936 and T937 are narrow but powerful 'convertibles' in the range.

=== Lifebook U ===
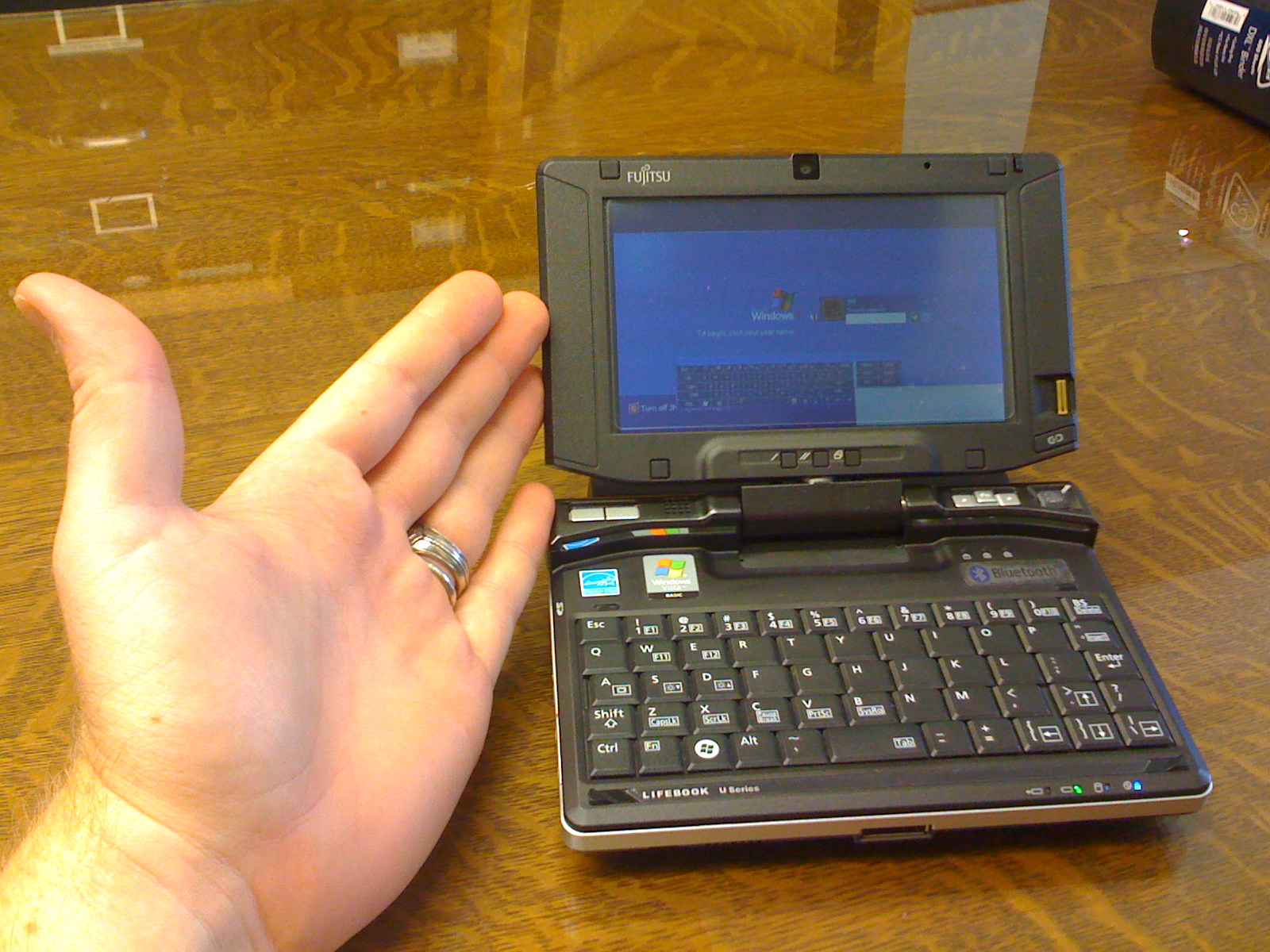
Lifebook U810

In May 2007, Fujitsu Japan presented an extremely small and light convertible tablet PC. The device, which weighs only 580 g, was marketed as a UMPC and is about the size of a PDA. In 2017, powerful notebooks that are light but not extremely small were sold in the series, which usually had a 13.3 or 14-inch screen diagonal (U747, U757, U937).

== Other series ==
Other series from Fujitsu are:

- Esprimo Mobile – affordable business series
- Amilo-PRO - another inexpensive business series
- Amilo (2000s) - Consumer series; also with special variants for computer players
- Celsius – Mobile workstations especially for CAD etc.
- Stylistic ST - pen-operated computers (slate tablets) without a keyboard
- NH - Laptops with 46.7 cm screen width, for multimedia and gaming

== See also ==
- Bento Note
- Modular design
