= EDT (Univac) =

EDT is a text editor running on the Unisys VS/9 operating system using the UNIVAC Series 90 mainframe computers, and as of 2013 runs on the Fujitsu BS2000 mainframe computer and operating system. It was developed by RCA for the TSOS operating system for Spectra series mainframes. The RCA version was later sold to Sperry Univac (which later became Unisys), and was released for the VS/9 operating system.

The Univac/Fujitsu EDT editor is a line-based editor, in that it does not use function keys. Unlike editors such as Teco or Emacs, the program is always in text-entry mode, similar to today's word processors.

Commands are sent to the editor by typing in text in the same manner as entering regular text, but the first character of the line (other than a space) is the command symbol, which defaults to the at sign ("@"). When a line begins with an @, the remainder of the line is used as a text-editing command. To enter a line of text beginning with @ which is not an editor command, it is necessary to prefix the line with a second @ sign, in which case, the first @ will be stripped off, and the line taken as text rather than a command. It is also possible to issue a command that the command indicator be changed from @ to a different character. One use for this feature is to write scripts to have EDT perform various actions upon another file. The command set of the editor includes the ability to create unattended programmable editing sessions through the use of test, comparison, branch and looping functions.

If line numbers are not present in the original file, the editor supplies a pseudo-line number for use in editing each line. Because of the ISAM file format which supports an 8-character index key, line numbers consist of a floating-point number in the range of 0.0000 to 9999.9999. The usual line number supplied by EDT starts at 1.000 and is incremented by 1 as each new line was added. Lines can be inserted between other lines by using a fractional number as a command prefix. For example, line 1 of a file would be 1.0000, line 2 would be 2.0000, and to insert a line between 1 and 2, one could type @1.5: followed by the text of the line; the colon would be discarded and the line would be inserted at 1.5000, between 1 and 2. A renumber command is available to renumber all or part of the file.

Commands in EDT generally consist of a command (which is case insensitive), which may be followed by a range of line numbers that the command was to act upon, and a subfunction indicating how the command is to act. The range was either expressed as a single line number, a range of lines separated by a dash, (e.g. 5-8 would mean any line numbered 5.0000 through 8.9999 inclusive), or a group of lines, each separated by a comma. Some symbols are available to represent various values, such as the ampersand "&" or the word "all" representing every line in the file.

For example, to alter every "To" in a document to the word "From" you would type in

@ON ALL CHANGE "To" TO "From"

or

@on & change "To" to "From"

followed by the transmit key (equivalent to Enter on a PC), and the editor would perform the action. Editing was basically full-screen, with actions not taking place until the user pressed the transmit key, a procedure very similar to today's practice of entering text into an input box in a web page, with no action being taken until the user clicks on the submit button.

Univac/Fujitsu's EDT editor provides extremely powerful editing capabilities, including

- text formatting similar to Runoff (in which commands were given for text editing by preceding lines with a period)
- possibly one of the first programs (the Univac 90/60 goes back to the late 1960s and early 1970s) to support the use of plugins to allow other programs to use the text the editor held in memory, as well as send commands back to the editor for processing.
- sort
- search
- editing of plain text and files with line numbers
- direct on-disk editing of files too large to hold in memory

Fujitsu's current release of EDT also supports Unicode, which did not exist when Univac released its version of EDT.
