= OS9 =

OS9, OS-9, or OS 9 may refer to:

- Mac OS 9, an operating system for the Apple Macintosh
- iOS 9, the ninth version of the iOS operating system
- OS-9, a Unix-like real time operating system
- OS/9, an operating system for the UNIVAC Series 90
- OS9 (gene), which encodes protein OS-9 in humans
