= OS/4 =

Discontinued UNIVAC computer operating system

OS/4 is a discontinued operating system, introduced in 1972, from UNIVAC for their 9400, 9480, and 9700 computer systems. It is an enhanced version of UNIVAC's 9400 Disc Operating System. OS/4 is a disc-resident system requiring 64 KB of main memory, two disc drives, a punched-card reader and a printer. The resident memory footprint is approximately 24 KB.

UNIVAC intended to replace OS/4 with a new system known as OS/7; however, OS/7 development was discontinued in 1975 when the 9700 was made part of the new UNIVAC Series 90 line as the 90/70.
