= IBM Rochester =

Technology campus in Rochester, Minnesota

Rochester Technology Campus
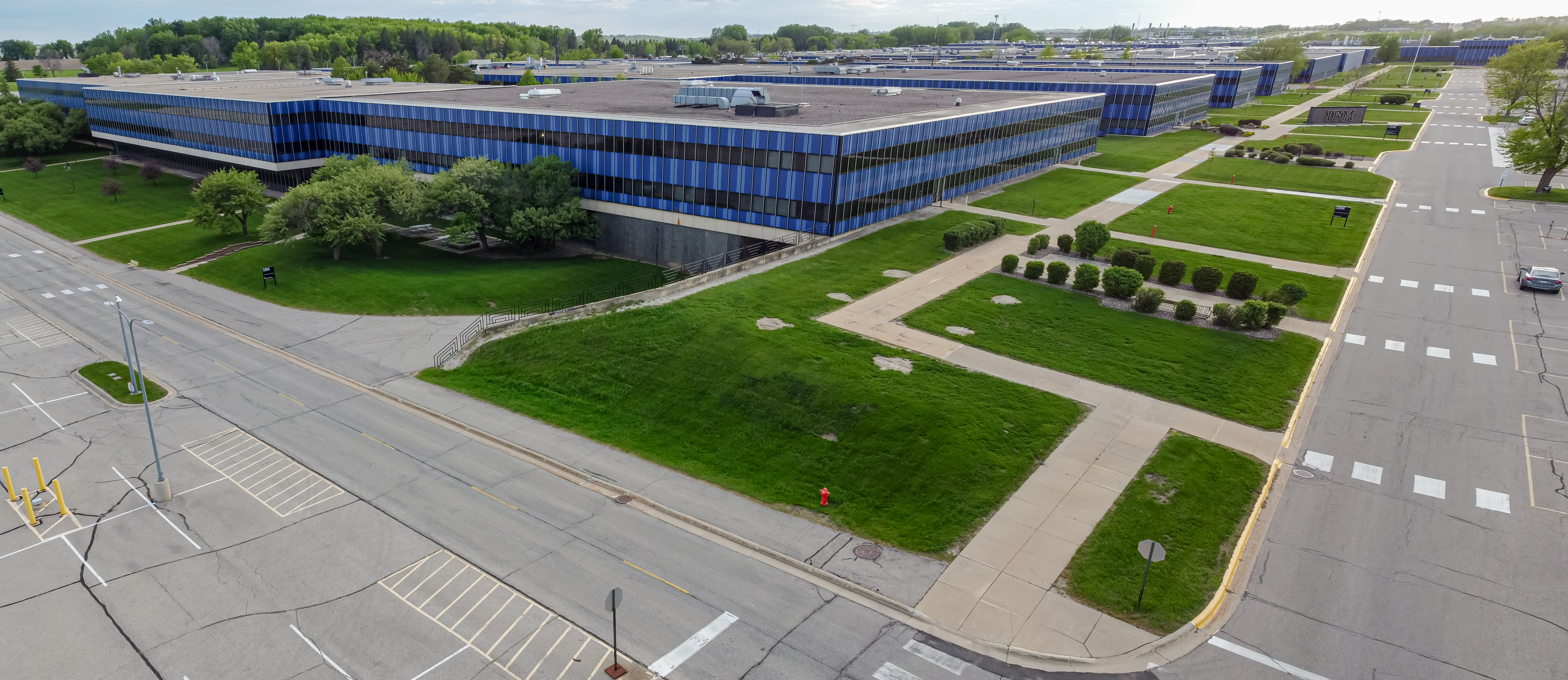

General information
- Status: Completed
- Location: 3605 Highway 52 North, Rochester, Minnesota, United States
- Coordinates: 44°03′30″N 92°30′20″W
- Current tenants: IBM, Western Digital
- Groundbreaking: 1956
- Inaugurated: September 30, 1958
- Owner: Industrial Realty Group

Technical details
- Floor count: 3
- Floor area: 3,100,000 sq ft (290,000 m^{2})
- Grounds: 492 acres (200 hectares)

Other information
- Public transit: RPT

Website
- https://www.ibm.com/ibm/history/exhibits/rochester/rochester_intro.html

The Rochester Technology Campus is a facility shared by several companies in Rochester, Minnesota, United States. The initial structure was designed by Eero Saarinen, who clad the structure in blue panels of varying hues after being inspired by the Minnesota sky and "Big Blue", nickname of the first occupant, IBM.

== History ==
=== Early years ===
IBM's CEO Thomas J. Watson Jr. reportedly chose the site of Rochester in honor of his copilot during World War II, Leland Fiegel, who lived there. Groundbreaking took place on July 31, 1956. When it was first completed, there was 576,000 square feet (53,500 m^{2}) of floor space. After expansion, it has 3.1 million square feet (290×10^{3} m^{2}) on the main campus, more than half the size of the Pentagon in Arlington, Virginia.

The building was first dedicated in 1958, but has been expanded considerably since then.

=== Current developments ===
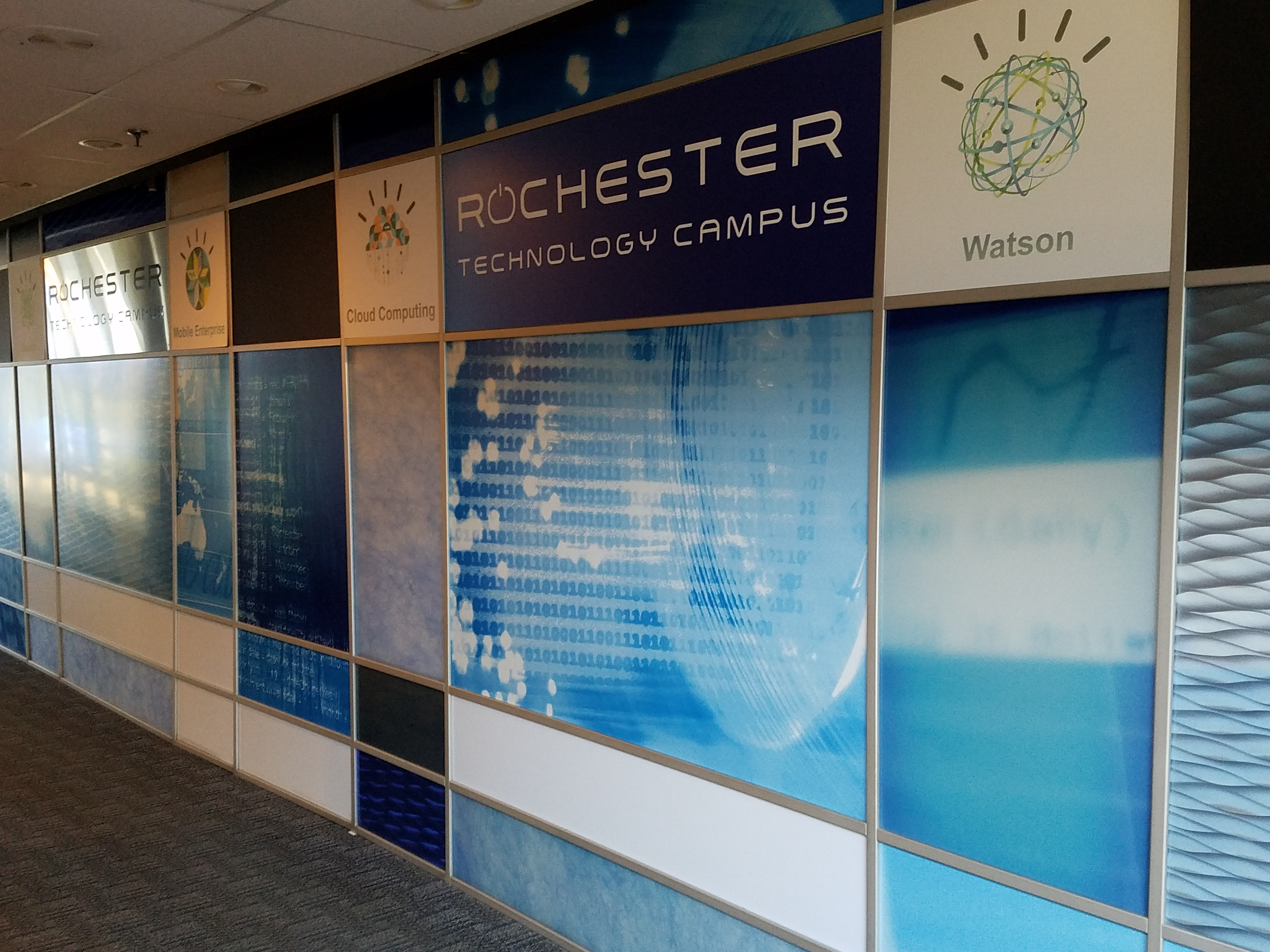
The site was renamed Rochester Technology Campus.

Employment at the site has gone through several cycles of growth and collapse, but is over twice what it was in the 1950s.

On May 4, 2016, it was announced that IBM would consolidate its remaining employees into the eight buildings on the east side of the complex and sell the remaining facilitates to a separate entity. This occurred after years of IBM renting out its various facilities to companies it had spun or sold off such as HGST. The site's employee count (excluding contractors) was reported to be 2,740 in 2013 and 2,791 in 2017, a steep decline from the high of over 8,000.

In February 2018 the property was sold to Industrial Realty Group of Los Angeles.

On April 24, 2018, in a presentation to the local community, it was announced that the site was renamed Rochester Technology Campus.

== Products ==
The mile-long facility is best known as the plant that produced the AS/400 computer system. The AS/400 system was itself an advancement of the System/38 that was introduced several years earlier with an inbuilt Relational Data Base Management System (RDBMS) making it leading edge for its time. The AS/400 was later rebranded as the iSeries. Development of the OS/400 operating system, now known as IBM i, continues at Rochester.

IBM Power Systems development is here.

PureSystems were originally assembled at this site, but are now mainly assembled in New York and Mexico.

The IBM 3740 Data Entry System was developed at the facility in 1973 and the follow-on IBM 5280 Distributed Data System had its beginnings there, but was transferred in 1981 to the Austin, TX facility, where it was released for production. The advent of personal computing swallowed up this type of data entry by 1990.

The IBM 5110 personal computer was developed and manufactured in the facility.

IBM Rochester was important to the Summit and Sierra supercomputers.

Some RS/6000, renamed System p, and hard disk development used to happen here.

The former AS/400 and RS/6000 systems both based on the POWER architecture were consolidated into the PowerSystems initiative.

== Distinctions ==
The AS/400 division at the plant received the Malcolm Baldrige National Quality Award in 1990. In November 2004, the facility claimed the top spot in the TOP500 list of fast supercomputers with a prototype Blue Gene/L system containing 32,768 processors. It was clocked at 70.72 teraflops. The manufacturing output of the site is so great that if it was a separate company, it would be the world's third-largest computer producer.

The plant, which is near U.S. Highway 52 in the northwestern part of Rochester, was recognized in 1990 by the National Building Museum as one of the significant contributions of IBM to the built environment of the United States, along with IBM's New York City headquarters and the IBM building in Atlanta, Georgia.

== Tenants ==
Hitachi Global Storage Technologies, although having been spun off from IBM Storage Technology, remains on-site, leasing otherwise unused space from IBM. Along with the Mayo Clinic, the IBM plant is one of the biggest employers in the Rochester area, reportedly numbering around 5,000 in 2002.

In 2019, Crenlo LLC rented part of the IBM facility to move part of its EMCORE manufacturing division, where it is currently separate from the Crenlo Cab Manufacturing line of products, as EMCORE was sold in 2021.

== See also ==
- List of works by Eero Saarinen
