= Herbert Haum =

German tourism executive

Herbert Haum (born 30 November 1925 in Birkhausen; died 25 December 2010 in Frankfurt am Main) was a German tourism executive. He's known as a founding father of German tourism and the founder of health and wellness trips.

== Biography ==
Herbert Haum, the son of a glassblower from Birklingen, studied business administration in Munich and after his graduation, he began his career at Unilever in Hamburg. In 1964, he became an executive for Neckermann Reisen, which is known today as Thomas Cook and which became a pioneer for cheap vacation flights under his leadership. He was dismissed by Peter Neckermann, son of the company's founder, Josef Neckermann, in 1968. In 1970, Haum contributed significantly to the founding of travel business ITS Reisen for Kaufhof AG, and finally, in 1975, he founded his own travel business, the FIT Reisen Gesellschaft für gesundes Reisen mbh (engl. FIT Travel Company for Healthy Travel), with which he laid the foundation for health and wellness trips. Due to some difficult health complications, Herbert Haum had to withdraw from company leadership in 2005, and died in Frankfurt am Main towards the end of 2010

The company remained under family ownership until 2009 when the Haum family sold it to Transmedic, a Hamburg company founded the previous year by Nils Asmussen and Jan Seifried who became managing directors of FIT Reisen.
