= IBM RPG =

Report Program Generator programming language by IBM

RPG Report Program Generator
- Paradigm: Multi-paradigm
- Developer: IBM
- First appeared: 1959; 67 years ago
- Stable release: RPG IV version 7 release 4 / October 6, 2020
- Typing discipline: Strong, static
- OS: CPF, SSP, OS/400, IBM i, OS/VS1, z/OS, DOS/VSE, VSE/SP, VSE/ESA, z/VSE, VS/9, PRIMOS, OpenVMS, Wang VS, Burroughs MCP, HP MPE, MS-DOS, OS/2, Microsoft Windows

Dialects
- RPG, RPG II, RPG III, RPG 400, RPG IV, RPG/ILE; RPG/Free, Baby/36, Baby/400, Lattice RPG, VAX RPG II

Influenced by
- 9PAC, FARGO

RPG is a high-level programming language for business applications, introduced in 1959 for the IBM 1401. It is most well known as the primary programming language of IBM's midrange computer product line, including the IBM i operating system. RPG has traditionally featured a number of distinctive concepts, such as the program cycle, and the column-oriented syntax. The most recent version is RPG IV, which includes a number of modernization features, including free-form syntax.

== Platforms ==
The RPG programming language originally was created by IBM for their 1401 systems. IBM later produced implementations for the 7070/72/74 and System/360; RPG II became the primary programming language for their midrange computer product line, (the System/3, System/32, System/34, System/38, System/36 and AS/400). There have also been implementations for DEC VAX, Sperry Univac BC/7, Univac system 80, Siemens BS2000, Burroughs B700, B1700, Hewlett Packard HP 3000, the ICL 2900 series, Honeywell 6220 and 2020, Four-Phase IV/70 and IV/90 series, Singer System 10 and WANG VS, as well as miscellaneous compilers and runtime environments for Unix-based systems, such as Infinite36 (formerly Unibol 36), and PCs (Baby/400, Lattice-RPG).

RPG II applications are still supported under the VSE and z/OS operating systems, Unisys MCP, Microsoft Windows and OpenVMS.

== History ==
=== Background ===
Originally developed by IBM in 1959, the name Report Program Generator was descriptive of the purpose of the language: generation of reports from data files. FOLDOC accredits Wilf Hey with work at IBM that resulted in the development of RPG. (Note: But FOLDOC dates RPG to 1965, rather than the 1959 mentioned here.) FARGO (fourteen-o-one automatic report generation operation) was the predecessor to RPG on the IBM 1401.

Both languages were intended to facilitate ease of transition for IBM tabulating machine (Tab) unit record equipment technicians to the then-new computers. Tab machine technicians were accustomed to plugging wires into control panels to implement input, output, control and counter operations (add, subtract, multiply, divide). Tab machines programs were executed by impulses emitted in a machine cycle; hence, FARGO and RPG emulated the notion of the machine cycle with the program cycle. RPG was superior to and rapidly replaced FARGO as the report generator program of choice.

IBM later implemented RPG (7070-RG-902), but not FARGO, on the IBM 7070/72/74.

The alternative languages generally available at the time were Assembler, COBOL, Commercial Translator COMTRAN or FORTRAN. Assembler and COBOL were more common in mainframe business operations (707X, 7080, System/360 models 30 and above) and RPG more commonly used by customers who were in transition from tabulating equipment (14xx, System/360 model 20).

=== RPG II ===
RPG II was introduced about 1969 with the System/3 series of computers. It was later used on System/32, System/34, and System/36, with an improved version of the language. RPG II was also available for larger systems, including the IBM System/370 mainframe running DOS/VSE (then VSE/SP, VSE/ESA, and z/VSE). ICL also produced a version on its VME/K operating system.

In the early days of RPG, its major strength was the program cycle. A programmer would write code to process an individual record, and the program cycle would execute the change against every record of a file, taking care of the control flow. At that time each record (individual punched card) would be compared to each line in the program, which would act upon the record, or not, based upon whether that line had an "indicator" turned "on" or "off". The indicator consisted of a set of logical variables numbered 01–99 for user-defined purposes, or other smaller sets based upon record, field, or report processing functions. The concept of level breaks and matching records is unique to the RPG II language, and was originally developed with card readers in mind. The matching record feature of the cycle enabled easy processing of files having a header-to-detail relationship. RPG programs written to take advantage of the program cycle could produce complex reports with far fewer lines of computer code than programs written in COBOL and other business-centric languages.

The program File Specifications, listed all files being written to, read from or updated, followed by Data Definition Specifications containing program elements such as Data Structures and dimensional arrays, much like a "Working-Storage" section of a COBOL program. This is followed by Calculation Specifications, which contain the executable instructions. Output Specifications can follow which can be used to determine the layout of other files or reports. Alternatively files, some data structures and reports can be defined externally, mostly eliminating the need to hand code input and output ("I/O") specifications.

=== RPG III ===
RPG III was created for the System/38 and its successor the AS/400. RPG III significantly departed from the original language, providing modern structured constructs like IF-ENDIF blocks, DO loops, and subroutines. RPG III was also available for larger systems including the IBM System/370 mainframe running OS/VS1. It was also available from Unisys for the VS/9 operating system running on the UNIVAC Series 90 mainframes.

Since the introduction of the IBM System/38 in 1979 most RPG programmers discontinued use of the cycle in favor of controlling program flow with standard looping constructs, although IBM has continued to provide backward compatibility for the cycle.

==== DE/RPG ====
DE/RPG or Data Entry RPG was exclusively available on the IBM 5280 series of data-entry workstations in the early '80s. It was similar to RPG III but lacking external Data Descriptions (DDS) to describe data(files) like on the System/38 and its successors. Instead, the DDS part had to be included into the RPG source itself.

==== RPG/400 ====
RPG/400 was effectively RPG III running on AS/400. IBM renamed the RPG compiler as "RPG/400" but at the time of its introduction it was identical to the RPG III compiler on System/38. Virtually all IBM System/38 products were rebranded as xxx/400 and the RPG compiler was no exception. RPG III compiled with the RPG/400 compiler offered nothing new to the RPG III language until IBM began development of new operation codes, such as SCAN, CAT and XLATE after several years of AS/400 availability. These enhancements to RPG III were not available in the System/38 version of RPG III.

=== RPG IV and ILE RPG ===
RPG IV, a.k.a. RPG ILE, was released in 1994 as part of the V3R2 release of OS/400 (now known as IBM i).

With the release of RPG IV, the RPG name was officially no longer an initialism. RPG IV offered a greater variety of expressions within its Extended Factor-2 Calculation Specification and, later in life, its free-format Calculation Specifications and Procedure syntax. RPG IV in the Integrated Language Environment framework is known as ILE RPG, and user guides explain the nuances of both. RPG IV and ILE RPG are supported by IBM in the current IBM i platform.

In 2001, with the release of OS/400 V5R1, RPG IV offered greater freedom for calculations than offered by the Extended Factor-2 Calculation Specification: a free-format text-capable source entry, as an alternative to the original column-dependent source format. The "/FREE" calculation did not require the operation code to be placed in a particular column; the operation code is optional for the EVAL and CALLP operations; and syntax generally more closely resembles that of mainstream, general-purpose programming languages. Until November 2013, the free format applied exclusively to the calculation specifications. With the IBM i V7R1 TR7 upgrade to the language, the "/free" and "/end-free" calculations are no longer necessary, and the language has finally broken the ties to punched cards.

IBM Rational Developer for i (RDi), an Eclipse-based Integrated Development Environment, is recommended by IBM for RPG development. The Source Entry Utility (SEU) text editor is no longer recommended for RPG development, and development ceased after IBM i 6.1. Other legacy developer tools include CODE/400 (based on IBM WorkFrame/2) and VisualAge for RPG.

==== Continuing language enhancements ====
IBM continues to enhance the RPG language via software releases and intra-release “technology refreshes” (TRs). More built-in functions (BIFs) have been added. It has the ability to link to Java objects, and IBM i APIs; it can be used to write CGI programs with the help of IBM's Cgidev2 Web toolkit, the RPG Toolbox, and other commercial Web-enabled packages. Even with the changes, it retains a great deal of backward compatibility, so an RPG program written 37 years ago could run today with little or no modification.

The SQL precompiler allows current RPG developers to take advantage of IBM's cost-based SQE (SQL Query Engine). With the traditional F-Spec approach a developer had to identify a specific access path to a data set, now they can implement standard embedded SQL statements directly in the program. When compiled, the SQL precompiler transforms SQL statements into RPG statements which call the database manager programs that ultimately implement the query request.

The RPG IV language is based on the EBCDIC character set, but also supports UTF-8, UTF-16 and many other character sets. The threadsafe aspects of the language are considered idiosyncratic by some as the compiler team has addressed threads by giving each thread its own static storage, rather than make the RPG run-time environment re-entrant. This has been noted to muddle the distinction between a thread and a process (making RPG IV threads a kind of hybrid between threads and processes).

In 2010, IBM launched RPG Open Access, also known as Rational Open Access: RPG Edition. It allows new I/O handlers to be defined by a programmer - enabling data to be read from and written to sources which RPG does not provide inbuilt support for.

== Data types ==
RPG supports the following data types.

Note:
The character in the data type column is the character that is encoded on the Definition Specification in the column designated for data type. To compare, in a language like C where definitions of variables are free-format and would use a keyword such as int to declare an integer variable, in RPG, a variable is defined with a fixed-format Definition Specification. In the Definition Specification, denoted by a letter D in column 6 of a source line, the data type character would be encoded in column 40. Also, if the data type character is omitted, that is, left blank, the default is A if no decimal positions are specified, P when decimal positions are specified for stand-along fields, and S (ZONED) when decimal positions are specified within a data structure.

Data type	Name	Length	Description
A	Alphanumeric character	1 to 16,773,104 bytes (fixed); 1 to 16,773,100 bytes (varying-length)	Alphanumeric character
B	Binary numeric	1 byte (8-bit); 2 byte (16-bit); 4 bytes (32-bit); 8 bytes (64-bit)	Signed binary integer
C	UCS-2 character	1 to 8,386,552 characters (fixed); 1 to 8,386,550 characters (varying)	16-bit UCS-2 character (DBCS or EGCS)
D	Date	10 bytes	Date: year, month, day
F	Floating point numeric	4 bytes (32-bit); 8 bytes (64-bit)	Signed binary floating-point real
G	Graphic character	1 to 8,386,552 characters (fixed); 1 to 8,386,550 characters (varying)	16-bit graphic character (DBCS or EGCS)
I	Integer numeric	1 byte (8-bit); 2 bytes (16-bit); 4 bytes (32-bit); 8 bytes (64-bit)	Signed binary integer
N	Character indicator	1 byte	'1' = TRUE '0' = FALSE
O	Object	Size undisclosed	Object reference
P	Packed decimal numeric	1 to 63 digits, 2 digits per byte plus sign	Signed fixed-point decimal number with integer and fraction digits
S	Zoned decimal numeric	1 to 63 digits, 1 digit per byte	Signed fixed-point decimal number with integer and fraction digits
T	Time	8 bytes	Time: hour, minute, second
U	Integer numeric	1 byte (8-bit); 2 bytes (16-bit); 4 bytes (32-bit); 8 bytes (64-bit)	Unsigned binary integer
Z	Timestamp	26 bytes	Date and time: year, month, day, hour, minute, second, microseconds
*	Basing-Pointer; Procedure-Pointer; System-Pointer	16 bytes	Address to Data; Address to Activated Procedure; Address to Object

== Example code ==
The following program receives a customer number as an input parameter and returns the name and address as output parameters. This is the most primitive version of RPG IV syntax. The same program is shown later with gradually more modern versions of the syntax and gradually more relaxed rules.

      * Historically RPG was columnar in nature, though free-formatting
      * was allowed under particular circumstances.
      * The purpose of various lines code are determined by a
      * letter code in column 6.
      * An asterisk (*) in column 7 denotes a comment line

      * "F" (file) specs define files and other i/o devices
     F ARMstF1   IF   E       K     Disk    Rename(ARMST:RARMST)

      * "D" (data) specs are used to define variables
     D pCusNo          S              6p
     D pName           S             30a
     D pAddr1          S             30a
     D pAddr2          S             30a
     D pCity           S             25a
     D pState          S              2a
     D pZip            S             10a

      * "C" (calculation) specs are used for executable statements
      * Parameters are defined using plist and parm opcodes
     C     *entry        plist
     C                   parm                    pCusNo
     C                   parm                    pName
     C                   parm                    pAddr1
     C                   parm                    pAddr2
     C                   parm                    pCity
     C                   parm                    pState
     C                   parm                    pZip

      * The "chain" command is used for random access of a keyed file
     C     pCusNo        chain     ARMstF1

      * If a record is found, move fields from the file into parameters
     C                   if        %found
     C                   eval      pName  = ARNm01
     C                   eval      pAddr1 = ARAd01
     C                   eval      pAddr2 = ARAd02
     C                   eval      pCity  = ARCy01
     C                   eval      pState = ARSt01
     C                   eval      pZip   = ARZp15
     C                   endif

      * RPG makes use of switches.  One switch "LR" originally stood for "last record"
      * LR flags the program and its dataspace as removable from memory

     C                   eval      *InLR = *On

The same program using free calculations available starting in V5R1:

      * "F" (file) specs define files and other i/o devices
     FARMstF1   IF   E        K     Disk    Rename(ARMST:RARMST)

      * "D" (data) specs are used to define variables and parameters
      * The "prototype" for the program is in a separate file
      * allowing other programs to call it
      /copy cust_pr
      * The "procedure interface" describes the *ENTRY parameters
     D getCustInf      PI
     D  pCusNo                        6p 0   const
     D  pName                        30a
     D  pAddr1                       30a
     D  pAddr2                       30a
     D  pCity                        25a
     D  pState                        2a
     D  pZip                         10a
      /free
        // The "chain" command is used for random access of a keyed file
        chain pCusNo ARMstF1;

        // If a record is found, move fields from the file into parameters
        if %found;
           pName  = ARNm01;
           pAddr1 = ARAd01;
           pAddr2 = ARAd02;
           pCity  = ARCy01;
           pState = ARSt01;
           pZip   = ARZp15;
        endif;

      // RPG makes use of switches.  One switch "LR" originally stood for "last record"
      // LR actually flags the program and its dataspace as removable from memory.
        *InLR = *On;
      /end-free

Assume the ARMSTF1 example table was created using the following SQL Statement:

create table armstf1
(arcnum decimal(7,0),
 arname char(30),
 aradd1 char(30),
 aradd2 char(30),
 arcity char(25),
 arstte char(2),
 arzip  char(10))

The same program using free calculations and embedded SQL:

      * RPG IV no longer requires the use of the *INLR indicator to terminate a program.
      * by using the MAIN keyword on the "H" (Header) spec, and identifying the "main" or
      * entry procedure name, the program will begin and end normally without using the
      * decades-old RPG Cycle and instead a more "C like" begin and end logic.
     H  MAIN(getCustInf)
      * "D" (data) specs are used to define variables and parameters
      * The "prototype" for the program is in a separate file
      * allowing other programs to call it
      /copy cust_pr
      * The "procedure interface" describes the *ENTRY parameters
     P getCustInf      B
     D getCustInf      PI
     D  pCusNo                        6p 0   const
     D  pName                        30a
     D  pAddr1                       30a
     D  pAddr2                       30a
     D  pCity                        25a
     D  pState                        2a
     D  pZip                         10a
      /free
        exec sql select arName, arAddr1, arAdd2, arCity, arStte, arZip
                 into  :pName, :pAddr1, :pAddr2, :pCity, :pState, :pZip
                 from   ARMstF1
                 where  arCNum = :pCusNo
                 for fetch only
                 fetch first 1 row only
                 optimize for 1 row
                 with CS;
      /end-free
     P GetCustInf      E

As of V7R1 of the operating system, the above program would not necessarily need the prototype in a separate file, so it could be completely written as:

     H main(GetCustInf)
     D ARMSTF1       E DS
     P GetCustInf      B
     D GetCustInf      PI                  extpgm('CUS001')
     D  inCusNo                            like(arCNum) const
     D  outName                            like(arName)
     D  outAddr1                           like(arAdd1)
     D  outAddr2                           like(arAdd2)
     D  outCity                            like(arCity)
     D  outState                           like(arStte)
     D  outZip                             like(arZip)
      /free
       exec sql select arName, arAdd1, arAdd2, arCity, arStte, arZip
                into  :outName, :outAddr1, :outAddr2, :outCity, :outState,
                      :outZip
                from   ARMSTF1
                where  arCNum = :inCusNo
                fetch first 1 row only
                with CS
                use currently committed;
      /end-free
     P GetCustInf      E

Lastly, if you apply the compiler PTFs related Technology Refresh 7 (TR7) to your 7.1 operating system, then the above program can be coded completely in free-form, as follows:

       ctl-opt main(GetCustInf);
       dcl-ds ARMSTF1 ext end-ds;
       dcl-proc GetCustInf;
         dcl-pi *n extpgm('CUS001');
           inCusNo like(arCNum) const;
           outName like(arName);
           outAddr1 like(arAdd1);
           outAddr2 like(arAdd2);
           outCity like(arCity);
           outState like(arStte);
           outZip like(arZip);
         end-pi;
         exec sql select arName, arAdd1, arAdd2, arCity, arStte, arZip
                  into  :outName, :outAddr1, :outAddr2, :outCity, :outState,
                        :outZip
                  from   ARMSTF1
                  where  arCNum = :inCusNo
                  fetch first 1 row only
                  with CS
                  use currently committed;
         return;
       end-proc;
