= UNIVAC 9000 series =

Series of mainframe computers introduced in 1960s

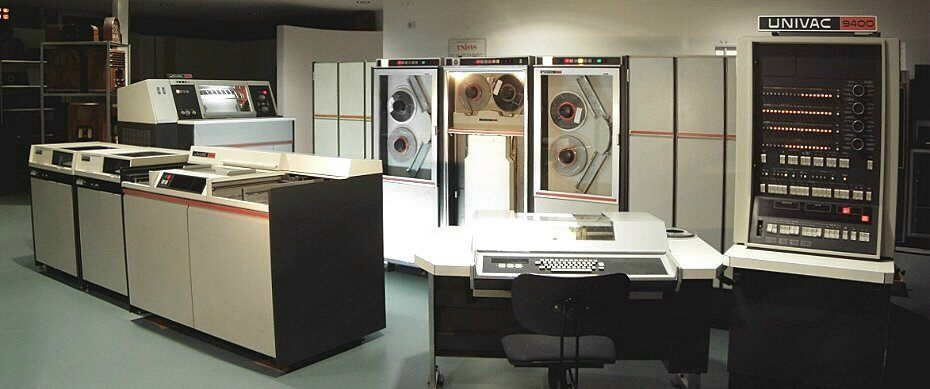
Univac 9400 installation

The UNIVAC 9000 series (9200, 9300, 9400, 9700) is a discontinued line of computers introduced by Sperry Rand in the mid-1960s to compete with the low end of the IBM System/360 series. The 9200 and 9300 (which differ only in CPU speed) implement the same restricted 16-bit subset of the System/360 instruction set as the IBM 360/20, while the UNIVAC 9400 implements a subset of the full 32-bit System/360 instruction set. The 9400 was roughly equivalent to the IBM 360/30.

In 1972, UNIVAC stopped development of its 9000 series systems, in favor of hardware acquired from RCA, now called UNIVAC Series 90.

== Hardware ==
The 9000 series uses monolithic integrated circuits for logic and plated-wire memory; the latter functions somewhat like core memory but uses a non-destructive read. Since the 9000 series was intended as direct competitors to IBM, they use 80-column cards and EBCDIC character encoding.

The family includes the 9200, 9300, 9400, and 9480 systems. The UNIVAC 9200 and 9300 were marketed as functional replacements for the UNIVAC 1004 and as direct competitors to the IBM 360/20. The printer-processor is one cabinet, the power supply and memory another and the card reader and optional card punch make an L-shaped configuration. Memory is 8 KB expandable to 32 KB. The 9200 II and 9300 II models, introduced in 1969, are extensions of the original 9200 and 9300 systems.

The printer differs from earlier UNIVAC printers, being similar to IBM's "bar printer" of the same era. It uses an oscillating-type bar instead of the drums that had been used until this point, and runs at speeds up to 300 lines per minute.

As Sperry moved into the 1970s, they expanded the 9000 family with the introduction of the 9700 system in 1971. The 9700 was said to be three to five as powerful as the 9400, twice as powerful as the IBM System/360 Model 50, and less costly than the IBM System/370 Model 145. A lower-cost replacement for the 9400, the 9480, was announced in 1973; it used MOS semiconductor memory rather than plated-wire memory.

== Software ==
The 9200 and 9300 run the Minimum Operating System, previously known as NCOS - Non Concurrent Operating System. This system was loaded from cards, but thereafter also supported magnetic tape or magnetic disk for programs and data. The 9400 and 9480 run a real-memory operating system called OS/4. A new operating system for the 9700, called OS/7 was under development, but was discontinued in 1975.
