= Plated-wire memory =

Variant of magnetic-core computer memory

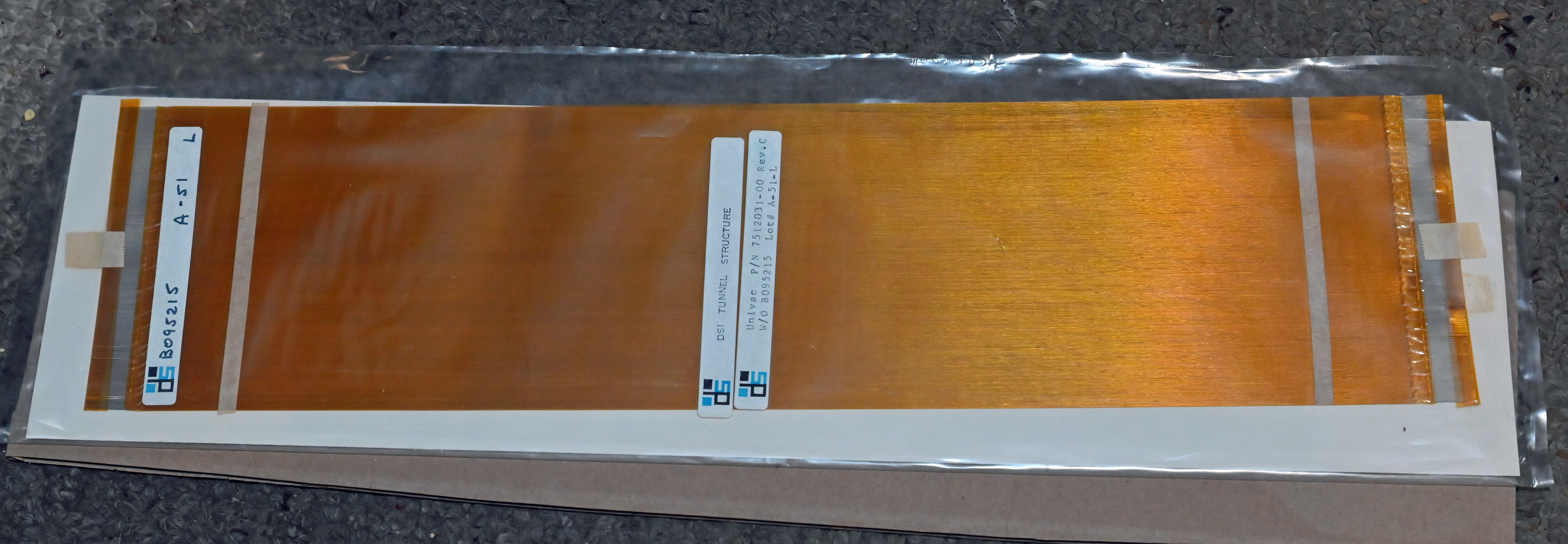
Univac plated-wire memory data plane

Plated-wire memory is a variation of magnetic-core memory developed by Bell Laboratories in 1957. Its primary advantage was that it could be assembled by machine, which potentially led to lower prices than magnetic core, which was almost always assembled by hand.

Instead of threading individual ferrite cores on wires, plated-wire memory used a grid of wires coated with a thin layer of iron–nickel alloy (permalloy). The magnetic field normally stored in the ferrite core was instead stored on the wire itself. Operation was generally similar to core memory, with the wire itself acting as the data line, and the magnetic domains providing the individual bit locations defined by address (word) lines running on either side of (and perpendicular to) the data wire.

Early versions operated in a destructive read mode, requiring a write after read to restore data. Non-destructive read mode was possible, but this required much greater uniformity of the magnetic coating.

Improvements in semiconductor RAM chips provided the higher storage densities and higher speeds needed for large-scale application such as mainframe computers, replacing previous types of memory, including both core and plated-wire memory.

Plated-wire memory has been used in a number of applications, typically in aerospace. It was used in the UNIVAC 1110 and UNIVAC 9000 series computers, the Viking program that sent landers to Mars, the Voyager space probes, a prototype guidance computer for the Minuteman-III, the Space Shuttle Main Engine controllers, the KH-9 Hexagon reconnaissance satellite, and in the Hubble Space Telescope.
