= OS/7 =

- Developer: Sperry Univac
- Working state: Discontinued
- Initial release: January 1974; 51 years ago
- Supported platforms: UNIVAC Series 90/60 and 90/70

OS/7 is a discontinued operating system from Sperry Univac for its 90/60 and 90/70 computer systems. The system was first announced in November 1971 for Univac's 9700 system and was originally scheduled for delivery in March 1973. However, the delivery slipped by nearly a year, which impacted the 9700 marketing effort. It was first demonstrated by Univac on the new 90/60 system in October 1973. The official release was then planned for January 1974. OS/7 was abruptly discontinued in 1975 in favor of VS/9, Univac's name for RCA's VMOS operating system.

"OS/7 is a multi-tasking, multi-programming system that utilizes a roll-in, roll-out capability to keep the CPU optimally busy."
