= Jon Paris =

Canadian computer scientist

Jon Paris is a Canadian computer scientist, author, and speaker recognized as one of the top experts on the IBM i platform. In 1987, Paris, then an experienced consultant, was hired by IBM to develop COBOL compilers for the System/36 and System/38 minicomputers. From there, he transitioned into the RPG group, where he played a pivotal role in the development of the modern RPG language as well as other language and development tools, including CODE/400 and Visual Age for RPG. He has also been instrumental in the porting of Python, Ruby, and other languages to the IBM i platform, as well as being a leader in pushing the adoption of completely free RPG. He is also an advocate for PHP on i.

== Personal life ==
Paris is married to Susan Gantner.

== Awards ==
In 2011, Paris was named Power Systems Champion.
