= BS2000 =

Computer operating system

- Developer: Siemens, Fujitsu Siemens Computers, Fujitsu Technology Solutions
- Written in: SPL, C, Assembler
- OS family: TSOS
- Working state: Current
- Initial release: 1975; 51 years ago
- Latest release: BS2000 OS DX V1.0C (V21.0C) / June 30, 2026; 4 months ago
- Marketing target: Mainframe computers
- Supported platforms: Fujitsu Technology Solutions SE-Series, with /390 and/or x86. Formerly Siemens 4004, 7.700 and 7.500 mainframes, /370, MIPS, and SPARC.
- Official website: www.fujitsu.com/fts/products/computing/servers/bs2000/index.html/index.html

BS2000 is an operating system for IBM 390-compatible mainframe computers developed in the 1970s by Siemens (Data Processing Department EDV) and from early 2000s onward by Fujitsu Technology Solutions.

Unlike other mainframe systems, BS2000 provides exactly the same user and programming interface in all operating modes (batch, interactive and online transaction processing) and regardless of whether it is running natively or as a guest system in a virtual machine. This uniformity of the user interface and the entire BS2000 software configuration makes administration and automation particularly easy.

As of 2017, it was mainly used in Germany - making up to 83% of its total user base - as well as in the United Kingdom (8%), Belgium (4.8%) and other European countries (Austria, Czech Republic, Denmark, Italy, Luxembourg, Netherland, Spain, Switzerland) (4.2%). 63% of all SE/S Servers are installed at the German Travel Association (DRV) and German Tax Authority.

== History ==
BS2000 has its roots in the Time Sharing Operating System (TSOS) first developed by RCA for the /46 model of the Spectra/70 series, a computer family of the late 1960s related in its architecture to IBM's /360 series. It was an early operating system which used virtual addressing and a segregated address space for the programs of different users. From the outset TSOS also allowed data peripherals to be accessed only via record- or block-oriented file interfaces, thereby preventing the necessity to implement device dependencies in user programs. The same operating system was also sold to Sperry Univac when it bought most of RCA's computer division. Univac's "fork" of TSOS would become VS/9, which used many of the same concepts.

=== 1970s ===
In 1973, BS2000 V1.0 was a port of the TSOS operating system to models of the Siemens system 7.700 In June 1975, Siemens shipped the enhanced BS2000 V2.0 version of the TSOS operating system for the models of the Siemens 7.700 mainframe series for the first time under the name BS2000. This first version supported disk paging and three different operating modes in the same system: interactive dialog, batch, and transaction mode, a precursor of online transaction processing. In 1977, the TRANSDATA communication system used computer networking.

In 1978, multiprocessor technology was introduced. The operating system had the ability to cope with a processor failure. At the same time the new technology considerably extended the performance range of the system. In 1979, a transaction processing monitor, the Universal Transaction Monitor (UTM), was introduced, providing support for online transaction processing as an additional operating mode.

=== 1980s ===
In 1980, Siemens introduced the system 7.500 hardware family, ranging from desk size models for use in office environments to large models with water cooling. In 1987, BS2000 V9.0 was ported to the /370 architecture supported 2GB address spaces, 512 processes and the XS channel system (Dynamic Channel Subsystem). BS2000 was subdivided into subsystems decoupled from one another.

=== 1990s ===
With the advent of the VM2000 virtual machine in 1990, multiple BS2000 systems, of the same or different versions, can run in parallel on the same computer. The hierarchical storage management system (HSMS) swapped out infrequently used data to cheaper storage media. When the data is needed again, it is restored to high-speed access media. The ROBAR tape archiving system supported robot systems. In 1991, the Security evaluation to F2/Q3 was completed. From 1992 through 1995, BS2000/OSD V1.0 was made open to application software and was renamed BS2000/OSD (Open Server Dimension). Full support of the XPG4 standard was achieved in 1995 after the porting of the POSIX interfaces in 1992. In 1996, BS2000/OSD was ported to the MIPS architecture. Although the operating system ran on different hardware architectures (S servers with /390 architecture and SR2000 servers for the MIPS architecture), applications produced for /390 can be used on computers based on MIPS architecture without recompilation due an emulation layer for legacy code. In 1997, WebTransactions allowed applications to use the Internet. In 1999, BS2000/OSD was the first operating system to be awarded Internet Branding by The Open Group.

=== 2000s ===
In 2002, BS2000/OSD was ported to the SPARC architecture, leading to the Fujitsu Siemens Computers' SX server line. In 2004, support for storage area networks based on Fibre Channel technology was introduced. In 2006, BS2000/OSD V7.0 introduced support for new server generations, Unicode support, and improved SAN integration. In 2008, BS2000/OSD was ported to the x86 architecture, and the SQ server line was introduced.

=== 2010s ===
In 2012, BS2000/OSD version 9.0 was released.

Pilot release of version 10.0 started in November 2014, and it was released in May 2015.

Pilot release of version 11.0 started in March 2017, and it was released in July 2017.

=== 2020s ===
Pilot release of version DX V1.0 (v21.0) started in March 2021, and it was released in July 2021.

Pilot release of version DX V1.0B (v21.0B) started in September 2023, and it was released in November 2023.

Pilot release of version DX V1.0C (v21.0C) started in January 2026, and it was released in June 2026.

== See also ==
- Timeline of operating systems
- VS/9
