= UNIVAC Series 70 =

Family of computer systems 1973

The Univac Series 70 is an obsolete family of mainframe class computer systems from UNIVAC.

In September 1971, RCA announced that it was abandoning the computer industry and Sperry acquired RCA’s Computer division. RCA had marketed the Spectra 70 Series (70/15, 70/25, 70/35, 70/45, 70/46, 70/55, 70/60, 70/61) that were compatible with the IBM System/360 series at the application level, and the RCA Series (RCA 2, 3, 6, 7) competing against the IBM System/370.

In January 1972, Sperry took over the RCA customer base, offering the Spectra 70 and RCA Series computers as the UNIVAC Series 70.

A number of the RCA customers continued with Sperry, and the UNIVAC Series 90 90/60 and 90/70 systems would provide an upgrade path for the customers with 70/45, 70/46, RCA 2 and 3 systems. In 1976, Sperry added the 90/80 at the top end of the Series 90 family, based on an RCA design, providing an upgrade path for the 70/60, 70/61, RCA 6 and 7 systems.

The RCA base was very profitable for Sperry and the company was able to put together a string of 40 quarters of profit.
