= IBM 5280 Distributed Data System =

IBM programmable terminal (1980)

The IBM 5280 Distributed Data System was a data entry system introduced by IBM in 1980 that expanded on the earlier IBM 3740 of 1973. The 3740 was essentially a computer terminal that recorded a user's data entry onto an 8-inch floppy disk instead of older storage media like punch cards or paper tape. The 5280 expanded on this model by including a complete low-end computer system that could be customized for different roles, ran faster, had more storage both internally and on the disks, and a better display. It also sported an enhanced styling, looking more like a contemporary all-in-one microcomputer compared to the 3740 large desk-like appearance.

== History ==
=== Data entry terminals ===
IBM had developed an efficient batch processing concept as the basis for most of its computer installations. In this approach, users did not interact with the computers directly, instead they would prepare their programs and data on separate systems, often mechanical or electromechanical, and then give the resulting information to the computer operators to process. The most common example from the IBM market was to input data using a punch card machine and then pass the resulting "deck" of punch cards to the computer operators. The operators would then load those cards into a tray containing many such decks, which would be processed one by one and the results output typically to a computer printer. The printout would then be returned to the user. To further improve performance, several card readers could be connected to a single magnetic tape machine, often run by a low-end computer. The decks would then be transferred to tape which could be loaded into the main computer more rapidly. Likewise, output was directed to another tape, which was then removed and placed in another system that could drive multiple printers. This style of operation ensured that the machine was used efficiently, with little downtime between "jobs".

The main downside to this approach is that it is expensive. Punch cards and computer printouts are not free, and their use often accounted for a considerable amount of the overall cost of running the system. IBM, having invested heavily in the batch processing concept, introduced the IBM 3740 as a way to address the costs associating with this style of operation. The system was essentially like a card punch in overall concept, but replaced the cards with floppy disks which could be reused many times, eliminating the cost of using cards. The disks also ran much faster, which could eliminate the need for additional machines like card-to-tape systems and tape-to-printer. Instead, the user would give the floppy to the operators, and the computer would read the data from the disk and push the output back to it. The user could then retrieve the disk and examine or print the results at the 3740.

=== 5280 ===
The 3740 was introduced in 1973, a time when the computer industry was changing rapidly. Through the 1960s, new concepts of how to arrange the data flow began to eliminate the middle steps, using terminals connected directly to a computer and software on that machine that could efficiently switch between inputs and outputs. This style of operation, timesharing, could outperform batch processing in some case, as any time that the machine might be waiting on external devices, like waiting for paper to be loaded into a printer, would then be switched to another process that was ready to run. Much more importantly, from the user's perspective, was that the total end-to-end time to run a process was reduced, as the user themselves entered the data directly into the machine and retrieved the output as soon as it was complete. Even if it took longer to run the program itself, the total turnaround time was greatly reduced. Users greatly preferred this style of operation.

By the mid-1970s, new "smart" terminals had further eroded the value of the batch processing concept, even one based on terminals like the 3740. Moreover, the introduction of low-cost microprocessors and dynamic RAM allowed a desktop machine to offer much greater power than those of the early 1970s. These changes significantly eroded the value of systems like the 3740, which could not be programmed to provide editing commands on the terminal end. A smart terminal, for instance, could change its style of editing under program control, and thus tailor itself from a system aiding the entry of text in a word processor to something able to handle the needs of the APL language.

IBM's response to this problem was the 5280, which they described as a "Distributed Data System" in its 1980 announcement. Its role was described as "a new low-cost product family to enter data into larger computers, communicate data and process data on the spot." In contrast to the desk-sized 3740, the 5280 was about the size of a contemporary all-in-one microcomputer like the TRS-80 Model III. A keyboard extended from the front of the machine, with a large (for the era) computer monitor above it and to the left, and one or two 8-inch floppy drives to the right of the monitor. Instead of being a desk, the 5280 sat on one.

However, those same changes in technology were leading to new desktop computers that could perform all of the actions of the 5280, while being complete computers on their own. This change was hastened by the introduction of the IBM PC, which had all of the capabilities of the 5280 and differed largely in that they stored data on the newest 5.25-inch disks rather than 8-inch. The need for systems like the 5280 was greatly reduced, and as the cost difference was minimal, the concept of a dedicated data entry system largely disappeared and the 5280 was not very successful. By 1982, IBM conceded that these offerings had "stiff competition" (described by a securities analyst as "have not been doing all that well.")

== Configuration ==
The following equipment was available for the IBM 5280 Distributed Data System (see the table for more specifications):

- IBM 5285 Programmable Data Station (COBOL, IBM RPG, DE/RPG languages, was built on a very fast microprocessor - not Intel based.
- IBM 5286 Dual Programmable Data Station (COBOL, IBM RPG, DE/RPG), fast microprocessor- not Intel based, single screen split using mirrors to display to both users from a single large display.)
- IBM 5288 Programmable Control Unit (standalone, provides extra resources and computing power to run four Programmable Stations)
- IBM 5225 Printer (line printer up to 580 lines per minute, large printer - floor model, standalone with bi-directional data cable)
- IBM 5256 Printer (Matrix printer up to 120 characters per second, small, table-top printer, standalone with bi-directional data cable)

The configuration of the system is the exclusively the responsibility of the persons who the company has asked to determined which portions of the company will need data distribution products, how many and for which portions of their business environment. Of course, the expense of their decision might play heavily into the final configuration(s) purchased.

When configuring the component equipment for the office complex might consist of several data stations with or without printers attached. Some of the larger offices would likely have similar configuration plus a data converter and a larger printer available on one of the work stations. If a large office complex is available and the data handling capability is needed, then a large number of dual data stations could be used along with possibly another data converter and a line printer attached to an IBM 5281 Programmable Distribute Data Station which is used by the lead person in charge of the operators of the dual work stations. More lead person single stations may be necessary depending on the company and the environment.

== Equipment ==
- Table of Offerings vs. capabilities

Feature	IBM 5285 Programmable Data Station	IBM 5286 Dual Programmable Data Station	IBM 5288 Programmable Control Unit
Processor storage	32K, 48K or 64K(*)	32K, 48K or 64K	32K to 160K
Integrated Diskette drives	One or two drives	Two drives	One to four drives
OnLine Data Storage	0.25 to 2.4 megabytes	0.5 to 2.4 megabytes	0.25 to 4.8 megabytes
Display / Keyboard	12-inch display (480, 960 or 1920 characters), keyboard	split 12-inch display two 480 character screens, allows TWO operators	up to four operators

(*) In December 1983 IBM increased the maximum internal storage of the 5285 to 96K that "can be configured into several partitions that operate independently." This feature (described as "multiprogramming") already was available in the two higher models.

The IBM 5280 Distributed Data System was designed to make the station independent of the system for which the data was being collected. The work station could be placed in varied environments to allow on-location data entry according to the needs of the user. The dual work station offered an almost double capacity for locations with heavy data entry requirements. The system offered enhancements allow more processing power for programming, etc., through a standalone programmable control unit which could interface with up to four Programmable Stations. To provide interaction with mainframe and other computers as needed, the Programmable Stations connected using a LAN cable for Token Ring to mainframes such as IBM System/360 or IBM System/370 and mid-range computers like IBM System/3, IBM System/36 or IBM System/38. In addition local matrix printer capability at 40 cps, 80 cps and 120 cps as well as the faster line printer at up to 500 lines per minute are available connected to the Token Ring makes the system even more usable.

- IBM 5285 Programmable Data Station

The single station version of the Programmable Data Station is a table top unit mounted to the station table. The table is slightly shorter than a desk top and approximately the same size as a small desk. The unit has locations for multiple 8" floppy drives and connects to the Token Ring LAN if available. See the table above for details about size of memory, etc. The unit is programmable using its own internal memory and code may be written in COBOL or either of two versions of RPG. This ability allows preprocessing of the data to be stored and also makes it possible to generate reports as needed right away.

- IBM 5286 Programmable Dual Data Station

The dual station version of the Programmable Data Station is a table top unit mounted into the station table. The table is slightly shorter than a desk top and a little larger than a small desk. The unit has locations for multiple 8" floppy drives and connects to the Token Ring LAN if available. The single display is split and with the use of mirrors it possible for both operators to see the display at the same time. See the table above for details about size of memory, other specifications, etc. The unit is programmable using its own internal memory and code may be written in COBOL or either of two versions of RPG. This ability allows preprocessing of the data to be stored and also makes it possible to generate reports as needed right away.

- IBM 5288 Programmable Control Unit

IBM 5288 Programmable Control Unit is a standalone processor containing resources and programming to control up to four Programmable Data Stations at one time using the Token Ring LAN in a separate LAN operated by the unit. The Unit has additional memory and programming capacity that can offload the load on the connected Stations, including storage. It also can connect on the Token Ring to the main computers.

- IBM 5225 Printer

The IBM 5225 printer is referred to as a line printer because it prints the entire line (or most of it) in each pass. It has four models, (1, 2, 3, 4) which collectively offered:

- print speeds of 280, 400, 490 or 560 lines per minute, respectively.
- 132 characters per line (10 pitch) or 198 (15 pitch)
- 6 or 8 lines per vertical inch
- 95 character set or multinational 184 character set

The IBM 5225 was also offered for use with the IBM System/36. In fact, any of the systems (IBM System/3, IBM System/32, IBM System/34, IBM System/36, IBM System/38, IBM AS/400) which support the IBM 5250 protocol Token Ring is likely to have been a user of the IBM 5225 printer.

- IBM 5256 Printer

The IBM 5256 is a dot-matrix printer and is usually referred to as character printer. The IBM 5256 can print at speeds of 40, 80 or 120 characters per second, depending on the model (1, 2, 3) respectively. The difference between the printers is the speed, but the only hardware change that is required is to move the jumper on the board, except in the case of the 40 cps machine the motor with small pulley and the shorter drive belt must be exchanged for the larger version used on the 80 and 120 cps machines. All three speeds are accommodated by the hardware and the programming on the adapter board. Another advantage of the base printer mechanism (code named Bahia) is the ability to print accurately in both directions (bi-directional printing). The line was queued to the printer and the characters produced appropriately in one direction while the next line was queued and was printed in the opposite direction. If the mechanism was interrupted, it could relocate the position and direction, and continue where it left off as long as the queued information was not lost. To achieve bold characters, the printer could print the bold area, backup, shift slightly and reprint the bold area. This ability did not produce a reliable nor suitable bold so the software did not implement it.

The IBM 5280 system software controlled the data in the form of characters delivered to the hardware to print by way of the LAN adapter, while the IBM 5256 printer adapter determined how to get the printing done in the most rapid manner.

The adapter for the IBM 5256 is operated by a microprocessor with on-board program that keeps track of the operations of the printer, including the timing of the pulses from the sensors that indicate where the head is located and how much the paper has been indexed up or down. There is very tight integration between the printer hardware and the microprocessor - one of the first times this was attempted at the time. The method used to assure that none of the pulses were missed and that they were all addressed properly and in time is the subject of an issued patent. The on-board program could cause the printer to move the head and the platen (paper scrolling) at the same time so that the printing speed was significantly improved. Of course, the paper had to be in position and stopped before printing could begin - all under the control of the dedicated microprocessor on-board the adapter.

The Token Ring adapter is separate from the adapter of the printer and was used to deserialize the data on the ring, presenting it to the printer adapter for action. The data received included characters to print as well as commands for the printer. An undisclosed amount of buffering was available for this function. To assure that the data was not lost, a minimum of at least two lines worth of characters had to be stored in order to be available during the print operation and for recovery after an error if it occurred. Plus the control commands had to be executed in the order they were received in the data stream.

Another feature of the IBM 5256 is the method by which the cover was constructed that allows it to be removed without releasing any screws or taking the printer apart. All that is needed is that the fan-fold paper if it is used, be held out of the way so that the cover can be removed in two half shells. This concept is also the subject of an issued patent.

The IBM 5256 was also offered with the IBM 5250 computer system, which now has become equated with the data stream that the Token Ring offering for IBM 5250 original system. However, the IBM 5256 is available on any IBM computer system that supports the IBM 5250 protocol and any of those systems (IBM System/3, IBM System/32, IBM System/34, IBM System/36, IBM System/38, IBM AS/400) who support the protocol is likely to have been a user of the IBM 5256 printer, but the IBM 5250 system actually lists the IBM 5256 as the printer component on the system in 1980.

== Programming languages ==
DE/RPG or COBOL are the languages supported.

== Options ==
A magnetic stripe reader could be attached.

== Applications ==
The 5280 attracted attention from software vendors.

== Clone ==
A clone of the 5280 was made in Eastern Europe.
