= OS9 (gene) =

Protein-coding gene in the species Homo sapiens

Available structures
| PDB | Ortholog search: PDBe RCSB |
| PDB | List of PDB id codes 3AIH |

Identifiers
- Aliases: OS9, ERLEC2, OS-9, endoplasmic reticulum lectin, OS9 endoplasmic reticulum lectin
- External IDs: OMIM: 609677; MGI: 1924301; HomoloGene: 31409; GeneCards: OS9; OMA:OS9 - orthologs

Gene location (Human)
| Chr. | Chromosome 12 (human) |
| Band | 12q13.3-q14.1 | Start | 57,693,955 bp |
| Band | 12q13.3-q14.1 | End | 57,721,557 bp |

Gene location (Mouse)
| Chr. | Chromosome 10 (mouse) |
| Band | 10|10 D3 | Start | 126,931,519 bp |
| Band | 10|10 D3 | End | 126,957,000 bp |
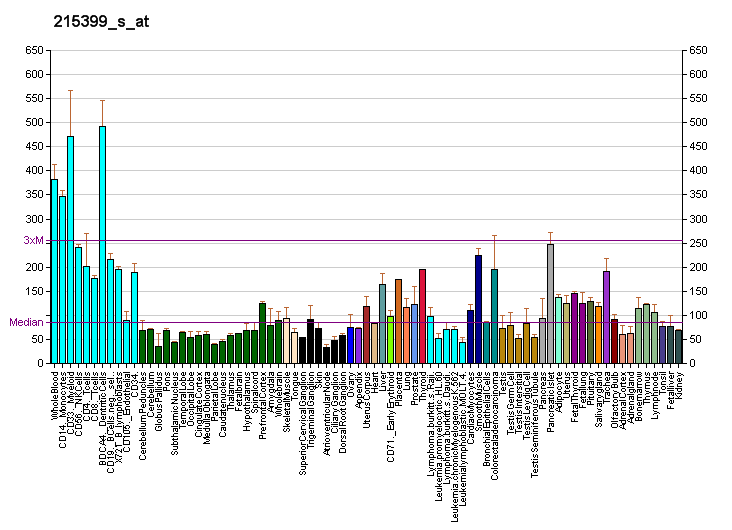

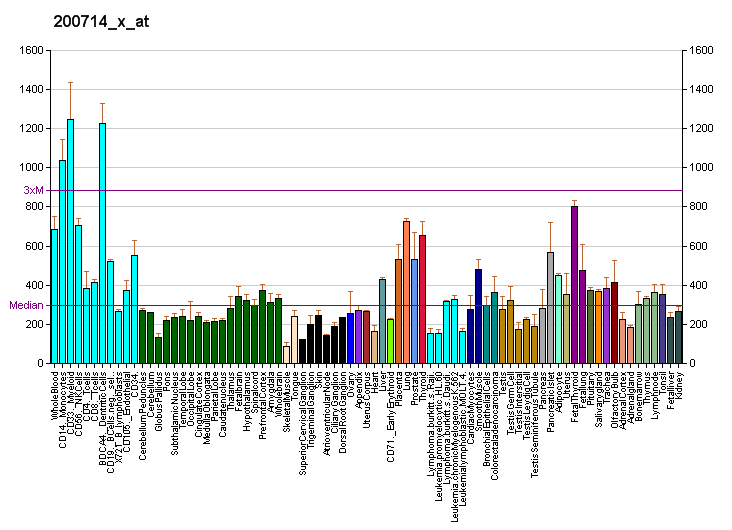
RNA expression pattern
| Bgee | Human / Mouse (ortholog); Top expressed in: Achilles tendon; tendon of biceps brachii; stromal cell of endometrium; monocyte; granulocyte; body of pancreas; islet of Langerhans; minor salivary glands; right lobe of thyroid gland; mucosa of ileum / Top expressed in: lacrimal gland; neural layer of retina; submandibular gland; granulocyte; right kidney; lip; dentate gyrus of hippocampal formation granule cell; parotid gland; superior frontal gyrus; molar; More reference expression data |
| BioGPS | More reference expression data |
Gene ontology
| Molecular function | carbohydrate binding; protein binding; protease binding |
| Cellular component | Hrd1p ubiquitin ligase complex; endoplasmic reticulum lumen; endoplasmic reticulum membrane; endoplasmic reticulum quality control compartment; endoplasmic reticulum |
| Biological process | protein targeting; protein retention in ER lumen; negative regulation of retrograde protein transport, ER to cytosol; protein ubiquitination; ubiquitin-dependent ERAD pathway; response to endoplasmic reticulum stress; endoplasmic reticulum mannose trimming; transmembrane transport; ubiquitin-dependent protein catabolic process; retrograde protein transport, ER to cytosol |
Sources:Amigo / QuickGO
Orthologs
| Species | Human | Mouse |
| Entrez | 10956 | 216440 |
| Ensembl | ENSG00000135506 | ENSMUSG00000040462 |
| UniProt | Q13438 | Q8K2C7 |
| RefSeq (mRNA) | NM_001017956; NM_001017957; NM_001017958; NM_001261420; NM_001261421 NM_001261422; NM_001261423; NM_006812 | NM_001171026; NM_177614 |
| RefSeq (protein) | NP_001017956; NP_001017957; NP_001017958; NP_001248349; NP_001248350 NP_001248351; NP_001248352; NP_006803 | NP_001164497; NP_808282 |
| Location (UCSC) | Chr 12: 57.69 – 57.72 Mb | Chr 10: 126.93 – 126.96 Mb |
| PubMed search |
- Wikidata
| View/Edit Human | View/Edit Mouse |

Protein OS-9 is a protein that in humans is encoded by the OS9 gene.

== Function ==
This gene encodes a protein that is highly expressed in osteosarcomas. This protein binds to the hypoxia-inducible factor 1 (HIF-1), a key regulator of the hypoxic response and angiogenesis, and promotes the degradation of one of its subunits. Alternate transcriptional splice variants, encoding different isoforms, have been characterized.
