= IBM 3740 =

IBM floppy data entry terminal (1973)

IBM 3740 Data Entry System was a data entry system that was announced by IBM in 1973. It recorded data on an 8" diskette, a new recording medium from IBM, for fast, flexible, efficient data entry to either high-production, centralized operations or to decentralized, remote operations. The "Diskette" was more commonly known as an 8-inch floppy disk. It was succeeded in 1980 by the IBM 5280 which added full programmability. The term "IBM 3740" is sometimes used metonymically to refer to the floppy disk recording format it introduced, which was the direct ancestor of the IBM PC floppy format which would become the industry standard in the 1980s and 1990s.

== History ==
The system was announced in January, 1973; became available in the second quarter of that year; and was withdrawn from marketing in December, 1983. It was developed by IBM's General Systems Division facility in Rochester, Minnesota. The IBM 3740 system was intended to replace the traditional unit record equipment, using the IBM card. While the IBM 3671 holds the distinction of being the first IBM device that was announced with the new highly successful 8 inch "Igar" diskette drive that IBM had developed in its Boulder lab and internally referred to as a 33FD, it then eventuated that the IBM 3740 was the first IBM product that actually shipped with one in May 1973.

== Configuration ==
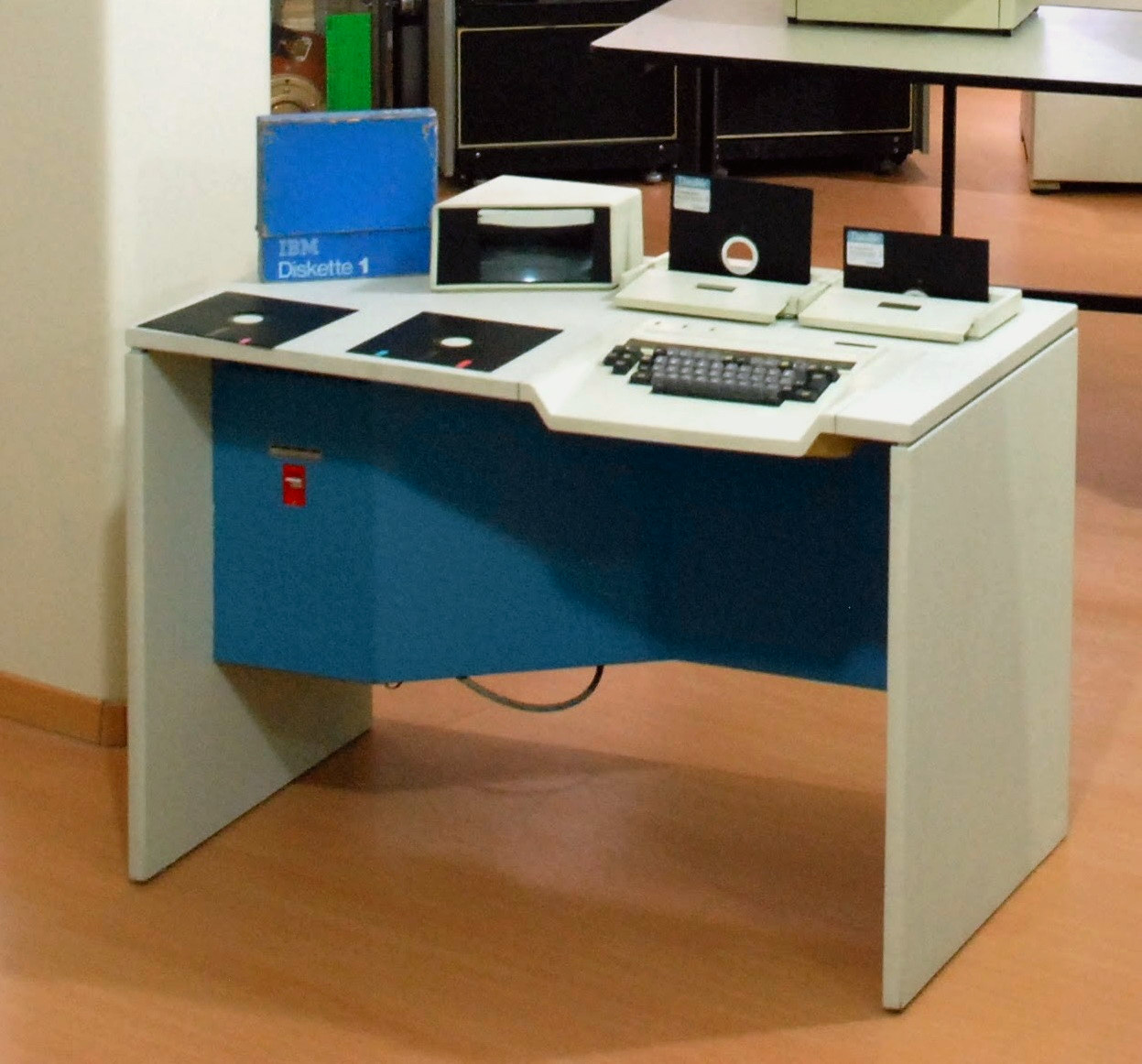
IBM 3741 Data Station

The IBM 3740 system consisted of the following equipment:

- IBM 3741 Data Station (four models)
- IBM 3742 Dual Data Station (designed for 'heads-down' data entry)
- IBM 3747 Data Converter (diskette feeder which holds up to 20 diskettes to be converted to the half-inch tape used by the computing system (mainframe) or optionally distributed by data network or telephone communications send and receive.)
- IBM 3713 Printer (for matrix printing on fan-fold or individually fed cut-sheet paper at up to 40 characters a second)
- IBM 3715 Printer (for bi-directional matrix printing on fan-fold or individually fed cut-sheet paper at 40 or 80 characters per second with an option of up to 120 characters per second offered.)
- IBM 3717 Printer (a fast line printer capable of 120 to 155 lines per minute)
- IBM 3540 Diskette Input/Output Unit (held up to 20 diskettes, for input to/output from mainframe computers such as IBM System/360 or System/370 and mid-range computers such as IBM System/3, IBM System/36 and IBM System/38.)

The configuration is the exclusive responsibility of the company employees who have determined which portions of the company will need data distribution products, how many and for which portions of their business environment. Of course, the expense of their decision might play heavily into the final configuration(s) purchased.

When configuring the component equipment for the office complex might consist of several data stations with or without printers attached. Some of the larger offices would likely have similar configuration plus a data converter and a larger printer available on one of the work stations. If a large office complex is available and the data handling capability is needed, then a large number of dual data stations could be used along with possibly another data converter and a line printer attached to an IBM 3741 Data Station which is used by the lead person in charge of the operators of the dual work stations. More lead person single stations may be necessary depending on the company and the environment.

== Equipment ==
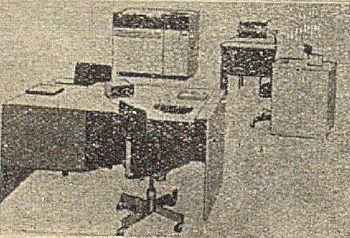
IBM 3740 system with IBM 3742 Dual Data Station on front

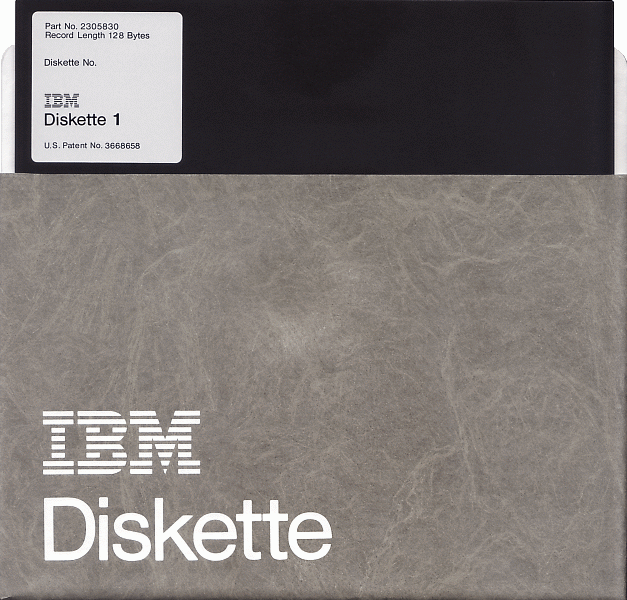
"Diskette 1" used by IBM 3740

The IBM 3740 System was designed to make the station independent of the system for which the data was being collected. The work station could be placed in varied environments to allow on-location data entry according to the needs of the user. The dual work station offered an almost double capacity for locations with heavy data entry requirements. The system offered enhancements to provide interaction with mainframe computers as needed, including a Data Converter and an in/out transfer capability with the computer over the data network. In addition local print capability at 40 cps for some of the models of the IBM 3741 as well as options to go up to 80 cps or even 120 cps on these units makes the system even more usable.

- IBM 3741 Data Station

The IBM 3741 Data Station is a work station which is similar in size to a small office desk - large enough to afford some personal space for the operator, yet small enough to allow many stations in smaller office spaces. The floppy disk drive was conveniently located on the work station and the height of the table is ergonomically determined for the convenience of the operator. The data could be written to the floppy diskette and later transmitted over data cables or telephone to the place where it was ultimately stored or used. Or the data diskettes could be transported physically to the location of its destination. Gone were the noisy key punch machines and drawers of cards to be transported to a reader for input to the computer system.

There are four models of the IBM 3741. Some models have the attachment interface to connect to a printer (IBM 3713, IBM 3715, IBM 3717). Models 3 and 4 allowed programming in what was called ACL, which was an assembler-like programming language that could be used to do some simple programming applications. Thus the user also had some ability to affect how the machine responded to the operator's input, including some limited ability for user 'programming' in addition to the prompting. The prompting ability was generally set up in advance for the enterprise, but the operator used the prompts to guide the entry and sets the station's programming according to their preference.

- IBM 3742 Dual Data Station

The IBM 3742 is a slightly larger desk compared to the IBM 3741. There are two monitors, two keyboards and two drives - the operators sit on opposite sides of the desk on either end. This arrangement allows greater density of operators by nearly a factor of two in larger operations. The functionality and options available for this work station are somewhat limited compared to the IBM 3741.

- IBM 3747 Data Converter

The IBM 3747 is a central receiver of the various types of media that the IBM 3740 system utilizes - it receives the data over the data cable or from an auto-feeding hopper of 8" diskettes and writes the data to the tape deck according to the type of tape drive needed by the user's system, both 7- and 9-track at various speeds. The Data Converter is also capable of the reverse operation, that is, reading from the tape and transmitting over the communication lines to other users.

The IBM 3747 is quite large, approximately 4' x 5' x 3.5' high and accessible on the front side for the tape deck and right end for diskette hopper. The electronics are arranged in the more traditional card on board configuration using predominantly TTL ICs and other proprietary IC components.

- IBM 3713, IBM 3715 Printer

The IBM 3713 and the IBM 3715 printers are matrix printers which are based on the same printing technology and differ only by the speed that is supported by the printer: the IBM 3713 at 40 characters per second and IBM 3715 at 40, 80 or 120 characters per second. The IBM 3715 is also bi-directional in that the subsequent line is printed in the opposite direction from the preceding line so that the printhead is not required to return to one side for each line. The design of the printer case of the IBM 3715 is an integral standalone, so that the printer and its paper input and output handling could be attached to the IBM 3741 model in use and is commensurate in height so that it could be positioned conveniently for the operator's use. The IBM 3713 requires a separate table or desktop space, with paper handling support.

The IBM 3715 printer is designed to use a single electronics board as the entire adapter and represents a very close integration of the mechanical hardware and the electronics of the board which in turn is directed by inputs from the processor on the host station. The difference between the printers requires a jumper change on the adapter board, but a different motor and pulley when changing a 40 cps machine to 80 cps. The same motor and pulley is used if the change is from 80 to 120 cps.

- IBM 3717 Printer

The IBM 3717 Printer is a band printer or line printer which is considerably larger in size and speeds measured in lines/minute rather than characters per second. Depending upon the number of embossed characters on the band being used, the printer rate with 64 characters is 120 lines per minute and with 48 characters is 155 lines per minute. The quality of the printed output is excellent and the bands have a reasonable long life. Though the bands are expensive and require replacement as they wear out, the speed and quality of the printed output overcomes the logistics of maintenance in many applications. The handling of the incoming paper and the printed output is supplied on the printer's stand.

This printer was significantly faster to users accustomed to a matrix printer, being capable of producing a day's worth of matrix printed output in a few minutes and having the printed output of higher print quality versus matrix printer output. However, the cost of the printer including service and maintenance made it unaffordable for many businesses. The life of the band in characters printed was relatively short compared to the life of the printhead of the matrix printer.

- IBM 3540 Diskette Input/Output Unit

The IBM 3540 Diskette Input/output Unit was not specifically part of the IBM 3740 system but provides high-speed input and output over a Token Ring LAN connection and through diskettes, not to tape as in the IBM 3747. The unit is also standalone, about the size of the Data Converter and uses a card-on-board technology with standard TTL and IBM proprietary logic ICs.

== See also ==
- IBM 1030
- "IBM 3740 Data Entry System System Summary and Installation Manual - Physical Planning" (PDF). June 1974.
