= UNIVAC Series 90 =

Line of computers made by UNIVAC starting in 1973

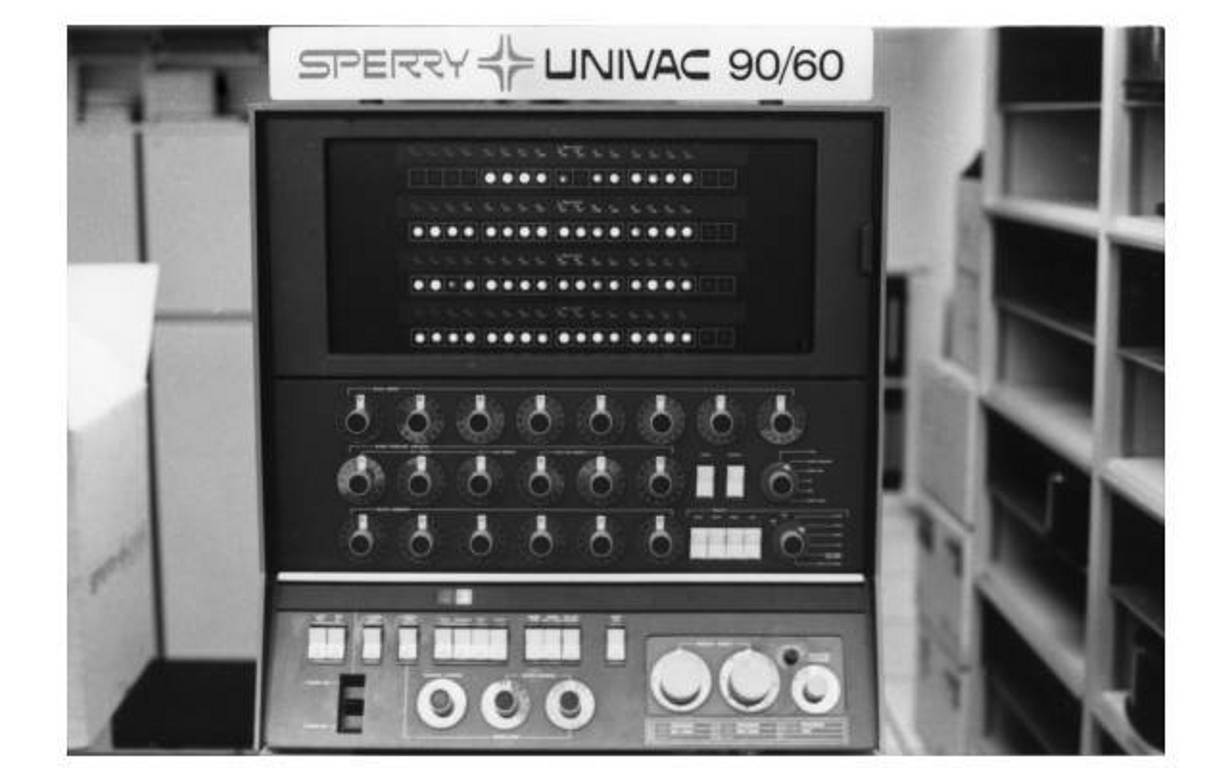
The Univac 90/60 system front panel

The Univac Series 90 is a discontinued family of mainframe class computer systems from UNIVAC, first introduced in 1973. The low-end family members included the 90/25, 90/30 and 90/40 that ran the OS/3 operating system. The intermediate members of the family were the 90/60 and 90/70, while the 90/80, announced in 1976, was the high-end system. The 90/60 through 90/80 systems all ran a virtual-memory operating system, VS/9.

The Series 90 systems were the replacement for the UNIVAC 9000 series of low-end mainframe systems marketed by Sperry Univac during the 1960s.

== History ==
Sperry had officially taken over the RCA customer base in January 1972, offering the Spectra 70 and RCA Series computers as the UNIVAC Series 70.

They redesigned the 9000 series' 9700, adding virtual memory, and renamed the processor the 90/70. They cancelled development of the real-memory OS/7 operating system in favor of VS/9, a renamed RCA VMOS. The 90/70, and a lower-cost, lower-performance 90/60 model, were announced in 1973. A number of the RCA customers continued with Sperry, and the 90/60 and 90/70 would provide an upgrade path for the customers with 70/45, 70/46, RCA 2 and 3 systems. In 1976, Sperry added the 90/80 at the top end of the Series 90 Family, based on an RCA design, providing an upgrade path for the 70/60, 70/61, RCA 6 and 7 systems.

A lower-end 90/30 model was announced in 1974, followed by a 90/25 model below the 90/30 in 1977 and a 90/40 model above the 90/30 in 1978.

The RCA base was very profitable for Sperry and the company was able to put together a string of 40 quarters of profit. Sperry also offered their own 1100 family of systems and the 1100/60 provided an entry-level system for converting the Series 90 customer base.

In 1980, Sperry announced the System 80 model which was an upgrade/replacement path for the 90/25, 90/30, and 90/40 machines. Initially it had two models, model 3 and model 5. The System 80 used less electricity, took less space and was faster.

Around 1982-83, Sperry announced they would cap the Series 90 Systems and would decommit the VS/9 operating system to concentrate on the 1100 series. After this announcement, Sperry would stumble on the revenue side ending their run of profitable quarters, resulting in some downsizing. The Series 90 Systems suffered from pressure from the IBM 4300 series systems that offered superior price/performance and may have induced Sperry to concentrate on the 1100. In a short time Digital Equipment Corporation, with their flagship VAX line of midrange computers would pass Sperry in terms of total revenue to become the number two U.S. computer manufacturer after IBM.
