= German tourism industry =

Inbound and outbound tourism of Germany

Germany has the largest outbound tourist trade in the world, with Germans spending about €80 billion annually to travel abroad (the United States is second), in spite of Germany being fourth in world in GDP and fourteenth in population. Germany also has the eighth largest inbound tourist trade, with receipts of around €24 billion.

== Inbound tourism ==
The German National Tourist Board is the primary organ for developing and managing inbound tourism (tourists visiting Germany). The GNTB's objectives include increasing the attractiveness of Germany as a travel destination, supporting regional and local tourism partners, and providing comprehensive information to potential visitors. Germany offers a wide range of attractions for tourists, including historical sites, natural wonders, and cultural experiences. Popular destinations include Berlin, Munich, Hamburg, Frankfurt, and the picturesque regions of Bavaria and the Black Forest. Germany is also known for its vibrant festivals, such as Oktoberfest and the Christmas markets, which draw millions of visitors each year.

== Outbound tourism ==
The German Travel Association (DRV) is the umbrella association for developing and managing outbound tourism (tourists from Germany visiting other countries).

DRV represents the interests of small, mid-sized and large companies in the travel industry vis-à-vis German, European and international policy makers and vis-à-vis service providers from Germany and abroad. It informs the public about the claimed advantages of tour operator travel and travel industry offers.

Furthermore, DRV supports cultural diversity and environmental issues. Other core tasks are market research and advising members on travel and competition laws as well as on standard terms and conditions. DRV provides its members with information on tax issues, sales models and on special topics like financial management and information technology. Training opportunities such as workshops and seminars are offered continuously to DRV members.

DRV Service GmbH is a subsidiary of DRV and has its registered office in Berlin. Its various tasks include the staging of meetings, congresses, seminars, workshops and road shows as well as publishing of a series of textbooks, studies and reference works for the travel industry.

== See also ==
- Tourism in Germany
