= RCA Spectra 70 =

Mainframe computer series, 1960s-1970s

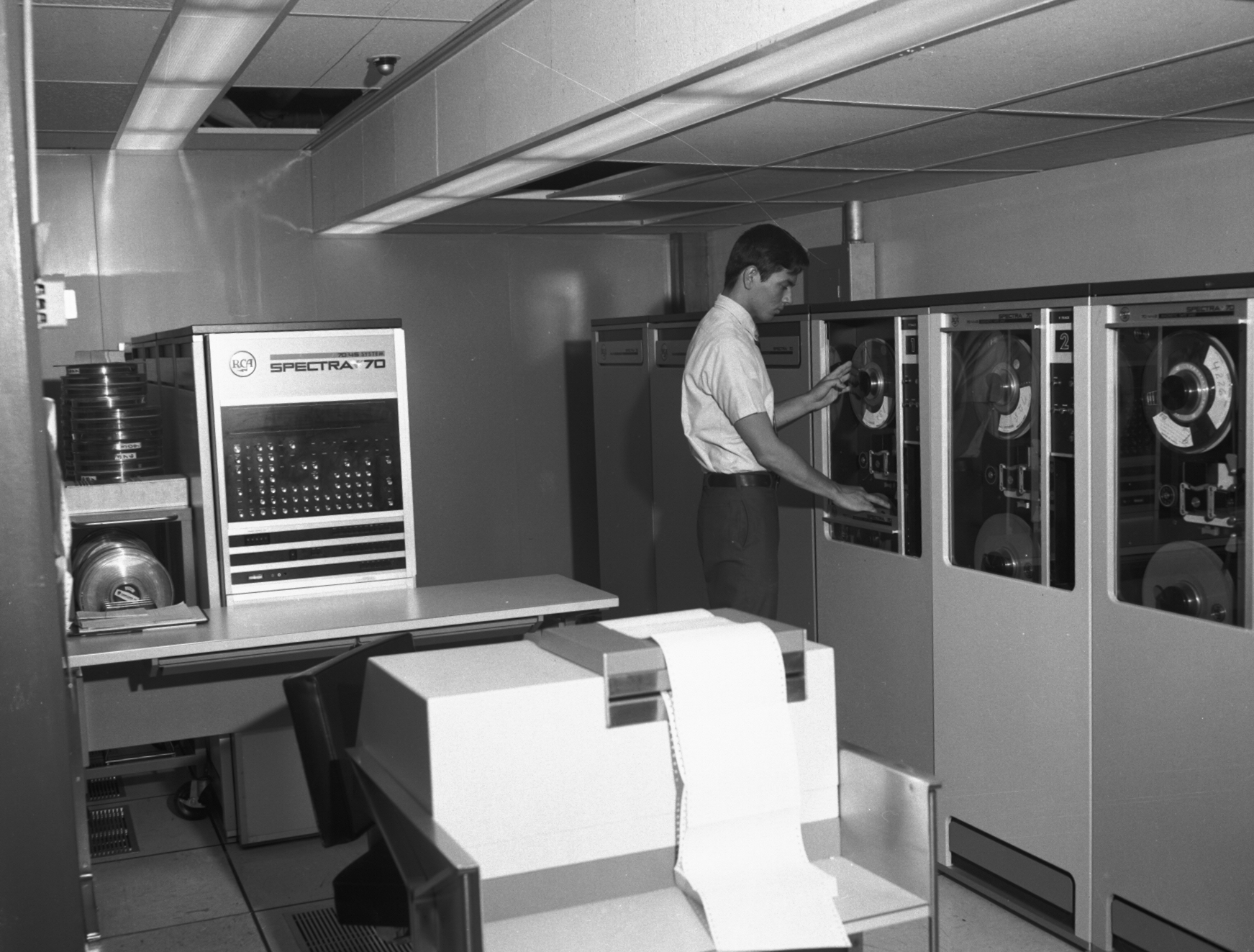
An RCA Spectra 70/45

The RCA Spectra 70 is a line of mainframe computers and related electronic data processing (EDP) equipment that was manufactured by the Radio Corporation of America’s computer division beginning in April 1965. The Spectra 70 line included several CPU models, various configurations of core memory, mass-storage devices, terminal equipment, and various specialized interface equipment.

The system architecture and instruction set were largely compatible with the non-privileged instruction set of the IBM System/360, including use of the EBCDIC character set. While this degree of compatibility made some interchange of programs and data possible, differences in the operating system software precluded transparent movement of programs between the two systems.

Competition in the mainframe market was fierce, and in 1971 the company sold the computer division and the Spectra 70 line to Sperry Rand, taking a huge write down in the process. Sperry continued to market the line as the UNIVAC Series 70.

== System overview ==
Five models of the Spectra 70 CPU were announced around 1965, ranging from a small system (70/15) to the large-scale (70/55). Some of the main features were:

- With the partial exception of the 70/15, these systems were mostly (Note: The 70/15 was only partly compatible; the 4 KiB model was upward compatible but the 8 KiB model was only compatible with the 4 KiB 70/15.) upward-compatible, allowing programs written for a smaller model to run on any larger machine in the series.
- Larger machines in the series were faster, with memory access times ranging from two microseconds in the 70/15 to 0.84 microseconds in the 70/55.
- Memory capacities ranged from a minimum of 4,096 bytes (4 KB) in the 70/15 to a maximum of 524,288 bytes (512 KB) in the 70/55.
- All used the Extended Binary Coded Decimal Interchange Code (EBCDIC) of eight bits plus parity for internal data representation.
- The use of a standard electrical interface allowed the same peripherals to be used with any CPU model in the series.
- Simultaneous input and output was accomplished by the use of intelligent communication channels. Like the IBM 360, two types of channel were available on all models except the 70/15: selector channels which could address up to 256 devices (one at a time), and multiplexer channels which could simultaneously address up to 256 channels by time-sharing the channel.

The full instruction set comprised 144 instructions, including optional floating-point. All machines supported decimal and binary fixed-point arithmetic. Floating-point instructions were not available on the 70/15 and 70/25.

The 70/15 did not support an operating system. Programs were loaded individually from cards, or optionally magnetic tape. A set of IOCS routines which could be linked with the user's program simplified interfacing with peripheral units. All other systems ran RCA's real-memory operating systems, DOS and TDOS. The 70/45 could also run a time-sharing operating system, The RCA 70/45 Basic Time Sharing System (BTSS), supporting up to 16 users. The systems that supported virtual memory, the Spectra 70/46 and 70/61 and the later RCA 3 and 7, could also run the RCA's Virtual Memory Operating System (VMOS). VMOS was originally named TSOS (Time Sharing Operating System), but was renamed to expand the market for the system beyond time-sharing. TSOS was the first mainframe, demand paged, virtual memory operating system on the market. The Spectra series was later supplemented by the RCA Series (RCA 2, 3, 6, 7— later renamed the 70/2, 70/3, 70/6, and 70/7, which competed against the IBM System/370. The RCA 2 and 6 ran the real-memory batch-oriented OS/70 operating system, while the RCA 3 and 7 ran VMOS. Some English Electric System 4 mainframes were rebadged Spectra 70 machines; others were English Electric-designed clones of the RCA Spectra 70 clones of the IBM System/360 range.

== Models ==
=== Model 70/15 ===
The RCA Model 70/15 (1965) was a discrete small-scale processor that could still support a variety of applications. Memory limitations and relatively low processing speed made its use as a stand-alone computer system somewhat impractical. It implemented a small subset of 25 instructions of the full Spectra 70 architecture, and was not downward compatible with the rest of the range. Also, the limited memory size available "obviates the need for a base address in that the displacement has the necessary addressing range by the addition of a high-order bit to permit addressing of up to 8,192 bytes." In this respect it was similar to the IBM System/360 Model 20.

Two memory configurations for the 70/15 were available: either 4,096 bytes or 8,192 bytes of core memory. The memory cycle time for a 70/15 was 2 microseconds per byte of information.

The 70/15 was often used as a satellite processor for larger systems or used as an intelligent terminal for remote job entry. Typical applications of a satellite processor would include card-to-tape conversion, card/tape-to-printer report generation, tape-to-card punching, input pre-processing and verification, or tab-shop tasks like file sorting, merge, and data selection. Software for this model did not include an operating system—the RCA 70/15 Programming System consisted of an "Assembly System, Loader Routines, Input-Output Control, Test Routines, Utility Routines, Communication Control, System Maintenance Routines, Report Program Generator, and Sort/Merge." Sort/Merge required a system with 8 KB of memory. The remainder could run in 4 KB. Programs could be run from punched cards or magnetic tape.

The Spectra 70/15 weighed 600 pounds (270 kg).

=== Model 70/25 ===
The RCA Model 70/25 (1965) was a discrete small-to-medium scale computer system that supported a wider variety of applications, including use as a free-standing system. In large installations, the 70/25 might also be used as a subsystem in a multi-processor complex. High throughput was facilitated by the use of fast memory and multiple simultaneous input/output streams. Equipped with selector channels and a multiplexer channel, the 70/25 could concurrently operate eight low-speed devices in addition to eight high-speed devices. Like the Model 15, it implemented a (slightly larger) subset of 31 instructions of the full range architecture.

Memory capacities for the 70/25 ranged from a minimum of 16,384 bytes to a maximum of 65,536 bytes. The memory cycle time was 1.5 microseconds to access one 8-bit byte.

This model weighed 1,200 pounds (540 kg).

=== Model 70/35 ===
The RCA Model 70/35 was the fifth in the series of Spectra computers that was announced in September 1965 (first delivery in 1966). It was a medium-scale computer combining third-generation technology (including integrated circuits) and speed in an efficient low-cost data system. The Spectra 70/35 handled a wide range of tasks at almost twice the speed of other general-purpose computers in its price range. Unlike the Model 70/45 and 70/55 it did not offer the option of a floating-point processor. The maximum memory was limited to 32,768 bytes from two 16,384-byte core memories. It was offered with both synchronous and asynchronous controllers that allowed it to communicate with other computers.

It was used by the Oklahoma State-Wide Computer Science System, starting in 1966, to connect remote RCA 301 computers in eight cities to host Vocational-Technical Education in computer science, which was the first state-sponsored program set up exclusively to train data processing personnel. The students were learning the fundamentals of programming and system operation with "hands-on" experience.

This model weighed 1,500 pounds (680 kg).

=== Model 70/45 ===
The RCA Model 70/45 (1966) was a medium-scale processor of relatively good performance for its time. A floating-point processor was available as an option and the 70/45 was considered suitable for commercial, scientific, communications, and real-time applications.

With a communications multiplexer, the 70/45 could accommodate up to 256 communication lines for interactive use as well as batch processing. Thus, the 70/45 was ideal as the core of a multi-system installation. The 70/45 was one of the first computer systems to use monolithic integrated circuits in its construction. This level of integration was to become the defining characteristic of third-generation computers.

Memory capacity for the 70/45 ranged from a minimum of 16,384 bytes (16 KB) to 262,144 bytes (256 KB). The memory cycle time was 1.44 microseconds to access two bytes (one half word) of information.

This model weighed 1,900–2,700 pounds (860–1,220 kg).

=== Model 70/46 ===
RCA Spectra 70 Model 46

The RCA Model 70/46 (1967) is a modified version of the 70/45 with an added capability for virtual memory. Advertisements for this computer as a timesharing machine referred to it as the Octoputer.

Programs can run in either 70/45 mode—without virtual memory—or in 70/46 mode with virtual memory enabled. Virtual addresses are 24 bits in length. Pages can be specified to be either 2048 or 4096 bytes in length, depending on program requirements, however 2048-byte pages occupy the lower half of a page frame in memory. The system allows a maximum of 512 pages. Virtual memory is divided into segments of 64 pages indicated by bits 1-5 of a virtual address. Although the instruction set architecture defines up to 32 segments, only eight are used in the 70/46. Incrementation of addresses wraps around on a segment boundary. With 4 KB pages, segments are 256 KB in length, and total virtual memory size is up to 2 MB. With 2 KB pages these numbers are halved.

=== Model 70/55 ===
The RCA Model 70/55 (1966) was a medium-to-large scale processor with excellent processor characteristics well suited to both scientific and large-scale commercial processing. The 70/55 maintained a high-throughput capability by offering up to 14 simultaneous job streams. Like the 70/45, the Model 70/55 made extensive use of monolithic integrated circuits.

Memory capacity for the 70/55 ranged from 65,536 bytes (64 KB) of core memory to 524,288 bytes (512 KB). The memory cycle time was 0.84 microseconds to access four bytes of information.

This model weighed 3,000–5,100 pounds (1.5–2.6 short tons; 1.4–2.3 t).

=== Model 70/60 ===
The RCA Model 70/60 was a later addition to the Spectra 70 series, having been announced in 1969.

=== Model 70/61 ===
The RCA Model 70/61 was the virtual memory model of the 70/60, and it was referred to as the Octoputer II in some advertisements. The 70/60 and 70/61 were the first RCA central computers to be capable of supporting 1 MB of core memory which was housed in four standard racks that formed a "T" with the rest of the computer. Each memory cabinet housed 256 KB of core memory with memory stacks and control logic and power supply in the bottom. These machines later became RCA 6 and RCA 7 respectively when the company replaced the blue and white cabinets with a new, more modern scheme. Although these computers were fast and reliable they came too late to impact the lead of the IBM 360 product line.

== Input-output devices ==
Input-output devices on the Spectra 70 series were specifically designed to interface with all models of the Spectra processor using the RCA Standard Interface. Initial product offerings in 1965 included:

1. Card punches that were fully buffered and able to operate at 100 or 300 cards per minute, depending upon the specific model.
2. Three models of printers were offered: a medium-speed printer running at 600 lines per minute, a high-speed printer running at 1,250 lines per minute, and a bill-printer running at 600 lines per minute on continuous forms and 800 lines per minute on card-stock. Like the card punches, the printers were fully buffered.
3. The Spectra optical card reader was able to read at up to 1,435 cards per minute with optional mark-sense reading available.
4. Paper-tape capability was offered with 5, 6, 7, or 8 channel tape punches and readers. The punched tape reader operated at 200 characters per second and the tape punch ran at 100 characters per second.
5. Three versions of magnetic tape were available running at 30, 60, or 120 kilobytes per second. In purely numeric mode, the tape reading and writing was performed at 240,000 digits per second. All tape drives were “industry” (meaning IBM) compatible and contained automatic error-checking systems. Either 7 or 9 channel tape code could be used and tapes could be written in the forward direction and read in both forward and reverse directions.
6. Direct access storage was available in the form of a high-speed 70/565 Drum Memory Unit with a capacity of 1 MB and an average access time of 8.6 milliseconds, a 70/564 Disc Storage Unit with an interchangeable 7.25 MB disc-pack and a data interchange rate of 156 kbyte/s, and a 70/568-11 Mass Storage Unit with 8 interchangeable 67 MB magazines.
7. The Videoscan Document Reader was an optical character recognition scanner with a speed of 1,300 documents per minute. This was primarily used to scan checks and similar transaction documents.

== See also ==
- History of computing hardware (1960s–present)
- RCA
- UNIVAC Series 70
