= Time Sharing Operating System =

Time Sharing Operating System (TSOS)
- Developer: Radio Corporation of America (RCA)
- OS family: Not Applicable
- Working state: Discontinued
- Source model: Unknown
- Initial release: 1968; 57 years ago
- Supported platforms: RCA Spectra 70 series mainframe computers
- Default user interface: Command-line interface
- License: Proprietary

Time Sharing Operating System, or TSOS, is a discontinued operating system for RCA mainframe computers of the Spectra 70 series. TSOS was originally designed in 1968 for the Spectra 70/46, a modified version of the 70/45. TSOS quickly evolved into the Virtual Memory Operating System (VMOS) by 1970. VMOS continued to be supported on the later RCA 3 and RCA 7 computer systems.

RCA was in the computer business until 1971 when it sold its computer division to Sperry Corporation. Sperry renamed TSOS to VS/9 and continued to market it into the early 1980s. In the mid seventies, an enhanced version of TSOS called BS2000 was offered by the German company Siemens.

While Sperry – now Unisys – discontinued VS/9, the BS2000 variant, now called BS2000/OSD, is still offered by Fujitsu and used by their mainframe customers primarily in Germany and other European countries.

As the name suggests, TSOS provided time sharing features. Similar to CTSS it provided a common user interface for both time sharing and batch, which was a big advantage over IBM's OS/360 or its successors MVS, OS/390 and z/OS.

== See also ==
- Timeline of operating systems
